= List of works by Clough Williams-Ellis =

== Sources ==
Compiled by Gareth Hughes, based on the preliminary list of drawings held in the RIBA Drawings Collection.

This is as complete a list as can be achieved, although some works have gone unrecorded because of the loss of most of Clough Williams-Ellis's office papers in a fire in 1951. In addition, a number of drawings in the collection are not from Clough's office and may represent schemes on which he was asked to comment, rather than design projects by him.

- – entries marked thus are known or reputed to be by Clough but are not represented in the RIBA Drawings Collection.

RIBA Catalogue references are shown as [general location / file], or file(sheets) where there is more than one sheet of drawings for a project.

== Argentina ==
=== Buenos Aires ===
Exhibition pavilion for the Ffestiniog District Slate Quarry Proprietors' Association at the Exposición Internacional del Centenario (1910)

== China ==
=== Guangdong ===
Shantou
Design for agent's house, ca. 1922 [PA439/16]

=== Liaoning ===
Dalian
Design for house at Sakaki-Machi, 1934 [PA481/2(1-2)]

=== Shanghai ===
Shanghai
Design for manager's house, for Messrs. Butterfield & Swire, 1924-ca. 1935 [PA442/10(1-36)]

== England ==
=== Bedfordshire ===
Henlow
Working drawing for memorial cross, for Christopher Gurney (print), 1927 [PA428/10(1-2)]
Design for tomb [PA428/11]

=== Berkshire ===
- Barkham / Finchampstead: Ridgelands House

Bradfield
Bradfield College, design for house, plan & elevation, 1924, & design for Housemaster's House, 1925 [PA430/5(1-9)]
Caversham Place
Design for 12 bedroom house, for Major-General Sir Cecil Edward Pereira, 1923 [PA2044/6(1-2)]
Design for house, for Major General Sir C. E. Pereira, plans, elevation & sketch perspective, 1923–24 [PA432/11(1-14)]
Ridge House: Design for alterations [PA442/1(1-3)]
Shrivenham (now in Oxfordshire)
Village centre, design, for Viscountess Barrington, 1919 [PA442/14(1-7)]

=== Buckinghamshire ===
Bulstrode Park
Layout of draft development scheme, 1931 [PA431/7(1-3)]
Denham
Savay Farm, design for alterations [PA481/6(1-6)] for Oswald Mosley
Great Missenden
Design for cottage, Great Hundridge Manor, 1927 [PA474/4(1-40)]
Great Hundridge Manor, Alterations 1933
Medmenham
Yew Tree Cottage, design for alterations & additions, for Sir Alfred Davies KBE [PA474/1(1-2)]
Stone
Village hall, design for additions, 1909–10 [PA442/21(1-3)]
Stowe
Stowe School, design for assembly hall & block of 6 classrooms & laboratory [PA439/12(1-4)]
Stowe School, design for Chatham House, 1925, column & classical capital for house & candlestick, 1925 [PA439/13(1-7)]
Stowe School design for chapel, drawn by Philip Dalton Hepworth (1888–1963) [PA439/13(8)]
Stowe School, design for Masters houses, assistant Masters hostel, Masters hostel, 1925 [PA439/14(1-7), PA439/19]
Stowe School, design for Boycott Pavilion, Temple of Music, Sanatorium, swimming bath, design for conversion of whitehorse block into boarding house, design for screen to entrance front, details of window to stable block, gates on Grand Avenue, 1925–26 [PA439/15(1-8)]
Unknown location
Design for a pair of country villas, perspective by Evans Palmer, 1924 [PA437/1]

=== Cambridgeshire ===
Cambridge
Girton College, steam laundry, plan, by Thomas Bradford & Co., 1895 [PA432/3]
Swavesey
Design for 4 pensioners cottages, plan & elevation [PA439/17]

=== Cheshire ===
Alderley Edge
Design for house, for A. A. Funduklian, plans & elevations, 1925 [PA485/23(1-2)]
Bolesworth Castle
Design & design for garden temple, for Robert Barbour, plans & elevations, 1920–27 [PA488/5(1-29)]
Bolesworth (Tattenhall)
Oarestowe cottages, design, plan & elevation, 1927 [PA488/6]
Hankelow
"Taikoo" (later Teekyn House), elevation [PA483/7] (Possibly for a member of the Swire family, Taikoo being the Chinese name for the firm of Butterfield and Swire, for whom Clough worked in Shanghai)
Harthill
Church, design for memorial (print) [PA428/5]
Tattenhall
Design for Rose Farm cottages, Glory cottages, for Robert Barbour, 1927 & pair of cottages type B, [PA440/1(1-4)]
Design for decoration of Ford delivery van for Messrs. Murgatroyds Salt Works, 1925 [PA434/7]

=== Cornwall ===
Penlee
Upper House, design for alterations [PA469/22]

Could also mean Penlee House, Penlee Park, Penzance

=== Cumbria ===
Dalton Hall
Design for alterations, 1968, & circular temple, 1972 [PA481/3(1-10)]
Design for rebuilding, for A. F. Mason Hornby [PA481/4(1-14)]
Killington
Service area & restaurant, 1964 [PA430/6(1-4)]
Workington
Moss Bay Hill, design for a pair of houses & terrace type house, 1941 [PA437/10(1-9)]
Solway terrace houses type A2, plans & elevation, 1941 [PA437/11]

=== Devon ===
Ashburton
Design for house, for Mrs. H. Radcliffe, designs & working drawings, 1927 [PA485/27(1-14)] probably Penpark (grid reference SX782725)
Design for alterations to house, for Lt. Comm. W. A. Bolitho, 1927 [PA485/28(1-2)]
Bishop's Tawton
(Codden Hill) Design for memorial seat, detail, 1971 [PA488/1]
(Codden Hill) Design for a monument, for Caroline Thorpe, first wife of Jeremy Thorpe MP (d. 1970), layout & lettering, 1971 [PA433/4(1-6)]
Clovelly
Survey drawing by Strutt & Parker, Lofts & Warner (print), 1962 [PA432/19]
Dawlish
Plan of layout of Pidgley estate, Dawlish U. D. C., 1932 [PA432/17]
South Molton
Road house, plans [PA474/5(1-2)]

=== Dorset ===
Chideock
Wyrneford, survey drawings of house, 1937 [PA432/14]
Melcomb
Satellite town development, layout plan, 1945 [PA474/2]

=== Essex ===
Burton Grange
[PA431/11(1-3)]
Chingford
Gilwell Park, design for alterations [PA432/15(1-2)]
Gidea Park
Reed Pond House, elevation & section [PA483/2]
Great Yeldham
Design for alterations, Mullers Lane cottage (print), 1935 [PA437/7]
Harlow
Hubbard's Hall, design for alterations & additions, 1934 [PA428/4(1-8)]
Moynes [sic for Moyns] Park
Design for alterations [PA474/7(1-2)]

=== Gloucestershire ===
Sapperton
Design for cemetery layout [PA442/8(1-2)]
Stroud
Burleigh Court

Design for Cottage 1935 [PA439/8];
design for layout of garden & loggia [PA439/9(1-13)],
design for layout of garden, by William Wood & Sons Ltd. [PA439/10(1-3)];
survey drawings, for Miss Frith [PA439/11]

Westonbirt
Design for garden house, water pavilion, entrance gate & pagoda [PA440/23(1-7)]

=== Hampshire ===
Aldershot
Design for Second Division Memorial, layout plan [PA485/24]
Ascot
Gilmuir, survey drawing & design for alterations, ground floor plans [PA485/26(1-4)]
Avon Tyrell
Design for cottage & dairy, for Lord Manners [PA486/5]
Burley
Design for house [PA431/8(1-3)]
Eaglehurst
Survey drawings, site layout [PA481/10]
Design for The Solent Steps [PA481/11(1-2)]
Octagon, Inland & Waterside Planners, 1977 [PA481/12(1-6)]
New Forest
Design for a house, for Miss Bland Strang, alternative plans [PA475/3(1-4)]
Preston Candover
Preston House, design for alterations (removal of Palm House) [PA441/5(1-3)]
Cottage, survey drawing, 1922 [PA441/6]
Ripley
Design for cottage, for the Hon. F. Manners, 1924–25 [PA442/2(1-2)]
Roche Court
Design for cottages, plans, elevation & section, 1912 [PA442/3]
Stanbridge
Design for house, for E. S. Williams-Ellis [PA442/16(1-4)]
Winchester
St. Cross Mill, design for alterations [PA440/24(1-3)]
St. Cross Mill, design for alterations, by J. R. Manning, 1902–02 [PA440/25(1-7)]

=== Hereford and Worcester ===
Burton Court, Eardisland
Design for alterations & additions, 1911–24 [PA431/10(1-7)]
Design for a Labourer's Cottage, 1908 [PA431/10(8)]
Design for pair of labourers' cottages
Overbury
Grasshopper Green, design for flat, cottage, 1944–46 [PA469/5(1-2)]
Grasshopper Green, design for cottages, 1944–46 [PA469/6(1-3)]
Tyberton
Stockley-Hill-on-the-Wye, Design for house, plans & perspective [PA442/20(1-2)]
Webheath
Design for parsonage, plan, elevation & section [PA440/19(1-3)]

=== Hertfordshire ===
Ashridge Park
Design for layout of 12 new cottages & other schemes, 1928–29, (Nos. 27–30 are details by S. J. Randell) [PA486/1(1-47)]
Survey drawings & plans showing drainage & sewage disposal, 1928 [DR135/2(1-4), PA2044/7(5-12)]
Bishop's Stortford
Bishop's Stortford College, Memorial Hall & Chapel, elevations, 1920–21 [PA486/10(1-6)]
Brickendon
Design for house, for Miss E. M. Swordes (print), 1937 [PA431/3]
Design for house, Hacketts Barn, plan & elevation, 1933 [PA431/4(1-2)]
Bushey Heath
Hartsbourne Grange, design for portico [PA431/12(1-2)]
Elstree
The Rising Star [PA482/3]
Little Gaddesden
Design for block of 8 cottages, for the Rt. Hon. J. C. C. Davidson, M.P. [PA482/8(1-3)]
Markyate Cell
Design for fireplace in saloon, 1910 [PA473/19]
Rickmansworth
Pynesfield Manor, design for alterations, for Trevor Williams [PA441/14(1-4)]
Royston
Yew Tree House, cottage adjoining boundary wall, design for alterations [PA442/5(1-2)]
Ware
The Round House, design for alterations, for Mrs. Page-Croft [PA440/12]
Watford
"Little Cassiobury" estate, design for layout of land, for G. Blake [PA440/15(1-3)]
"Little Cassiobury" estate, design for alterations & additions, for H. L. H. Hill, 1930 [PA440/16(1-23)]
"Little Cassiobury" estate, design for alterations, 1930 [PA440/17(1-6)]
Design for house, for Mrs. E. Mayo, plan & elevation, 1930 [PA440/18(1-2)]

=== Isle of Wight ===
- Farringford: group of holiday cottages (with Lionel Brett)

Yarmouth
Isle of Wight & Lymington Public Steam Laundry, plans [PA437/6]

=== Kent ===
Birchington
Cleve Court, details of bay window, for Sir Edward Carson, 1920–21 [PA486/8(1-4)]
Cobham
The Fish Ponds Restaurant, plan, Laughing water, The Ship Restaurant [PA432/20]
Hildenborough
Pair of Girls Homes for Princess Christian's Farm Colony, 1910 [PA428/12(1-4)]
Home for 25 feeble minded boys, Princess Christians Farm Colony, ca. 1910 [PA428/13]
Littlestone-on-Sea
Design of Romney Bay House known as The Mustard Pot, for Mrs. Margaret Ethel Bray, 1927 [PA429/7(1-13)]
Strood
Design for layout, for Evelyn Countess of Warwick, & design for small house [PA439/7(1-2)]
Tonbridge
Design for Trench house [PA440/3]

Design for addition to "Tracn", house between Mayfield & Tunbridge Wells [PA433/18]

=== Lincolnshire ===
Laughton
Shooting lodge, design for alterations, for Lt. Col. Francis Meynell, 1923 [PA429/2(1-4)]
Laughton Wood
Design for house, site plan, plans & elevations, 1922 [PA429/3(1-2)]

=== London ===
(Brent)
British Empire Exhibition, Wembley, 1922–24, designs for stands for various companies [PA477/7-10, PA478/1-9, PA479/1-13, DR134/2(1-3)]

(Camden)
Windmill Hill, Frognal Rise, alternative designs for house, for H. M. Lancaster Hill [PA480/1(1-26)]
Bunkers Hill, Hampstead, design for a house, plans & elevations [PA429/12]
Ellerdale Close, Ellerdale Road, Hampstead, design for 4 houses, 1934 [PA430/1(1-22)]
No. 15 Dorset Square, design for alterations & additions [PA429/16(1-6)]

- Romney's House, Hollybush Hill, alterations c.1929–39

Romney's House, Hollybush Hill, design for office accommodation, 1935 [PA476/3(1-4)]

(Haringey)
Design for a house, verso design for Welsh dresser [PA476/9(1-2)]

(Harrow)
Design for house, Stanmore, for Mr. & Mrs. Heisch [PA442/17] (Cheyne House, 63 Gordon Avenue)

(Kensington & Chelsea)
Addison Lodge, design for alterations, 1924 [PA429/8(1-6)]
Bolton Gardens, (probably The Boltons) Bladon Lodge, design for Eye Trap Temple, elevation [PA488/2]
No. 80 Ladbroke Road, design for alterations, 1921 [PA476/6(1-2)]
No. 24 Onslow Gardens, basement plan [PA476/10]
Ovington Square Mews, design for house, (32a) for W. I. Turner, 1924 [PA476/11(1-5)]
No. 53 Pont Street, design for heating & hot water supply & balustrade of front entrance [PA476/13(1-3)]
Pont Street, designs for houses [PA476/14(1-2)]

(Richmond upon Thames)
No. 2 Maids of Honour Row, 1920 [PA476/7(1-3)]
Design for house, Strawberry Hill, plan, 1910 [PA442/22]

(Wandsworth)

- Battersea: Battersea Dogs' Home (mostly demolished, the Cattery survives)

"Heathside", Putney Heath, design for alterations, 1923 [PA476/5(1-2)]
Design for development of island site adjoining Putney Bridge & perspective of cinema, for Leslie Wilson, 1927 [PA476/16(1-3)]

(Westminster)
No. 3 Barton Street, design for additions, for John Davidson M.P., 1925 [PA429/9(1-17)]
No. 49 Berkeley Square, design for alterations, for Lady Bunning, 1925 [PA429/10(1-4)]

- No. 48 Boscobel Place, remodelling

No. 40 Brook Street, design for alterations, 1920 [PA429/11]
No. 62 Cadogan Square, design for a block of garages with residence & chauffeur's quarters over rear, 1926 [PA429/13(1-8)]
Chesham Street, design for alterations, to rear of No. 85 Eaton Place, plan & elevation [PA429/14(1-2)]
Charles Street, Dartmouth House: Design for memorial Library [PA481/5] (English-Speaking Union)
No. 28 Chester Street, plan of basement [PA429/15]
No. 29 Eaton Square, survey drawings, 1921 [PA429/17(1-3)]
No. 69 Eaton Square, design for alterations (electric passenger lift), for the Rt. Hon. Earl Baldwin, 1937 [PA429/18(1-16)]
No. 12 Ennismore Gardens, survey drawings, for Mrs. A. Payne [PA430/2]
No. 15 Grosvenor Crescent Mews, design for alterations, plans & elevations, 1924–25 [PA430/3(1-6)]
Nos. 4–5 Grosvenor Place, Ladies Carlton Club, garage & swimming pool, 1929–30 [PA430/4(1-41)]
No. 8 Hanover Terrace, Regent's Park, design for alterations to garage at rear, 1925 [PA476/1(1-4)]
No. 8 Hill Street, design for alterations, for Geoffrey Fry, 1923 [PA476/2(1-26)]
All Souls Church, Langham Place, design for redecoration, 1922 [PA476/4]
No. 43 Leicester Square, design for alterations, for Messrs. Boulestin Ltd. [PA476/5(1-6)]
No. 56 Montagu Square, design for alterations, for Sir Henry Mather Jackson, 1921 [PA476/8(1-2)]
Oxford & Cambridge Club, Pall Mall, design for alterations, 1933 [PA476/12(1-5)]
No. 48 Royal Oak Place, design for alterations & additions, plan & elevation, 1925 [PA480/3]
No. 16 Rutland Gate, design for alterations, for Mrs. Payne, 1921 [PA477/1(1-7)]
No. 36 Seymour Street, sketch plan [PA477/2]
No. 22 South Eaton Place, survey drawings [PA477/3(1-3)]
No. 19 Warwick Square, design for maisonette [PA477/4(1-2)]
No. 14 Waterloo Place, design for communication door to No. 15, 1921 [PA477/5]
No. 86 Waterloo Road, drawing of Gothic window removed, 1965 [PA477/6(1-3)]
No. 62 Wellington Road, St. John's Wood, Corner House, design for house & studio, 1921–24, & design for additions to studio, 1926, for Oswald Birley [PA 434/12]
No. 13 York Street, design for alterations to the Spectator's office [PA480/2]
Rex Place, No. 8 Streets Mews, design for alterations [PA480/4(1-2)]
The Mary Summer House, for the Mothers Union, east front elevation, 1924 [PA480/5]

=== Norfolk ===
Thornham Marsh
View, plans, for Victor Ames [PA440/2]

=== Northamptonshire ===
Gayton
Manor House: Gate Piers and gates
Grafton House
Design for entrance gates [PA482/16]
Oundle School
Design for war memorial in ambulatory of chapel, 1923–25 [PA469/4(1-4)]
Stoke Bruerne
Stoke Park Pavilions, restoration

=== Oxfordshire ===
Aston Tirrold
Manor, Garden Pavilion & farm house, 1934 & gateway, 1955 [PA486/3(1-5)]
Farm house, plans by Harold Bulmer & S. Ricardo Pearce [RAN 32/A/16 (1–2)]
Banbury
Court End, Adderbury, design for alterations & additions [PA486/6]
Barford St. John
Design for garden loggia, plan & elevation, 1957, & gateway, 1961 [PA486/7(1-3)]
Chipping Norton
Cornwell House (Manor), design, including pump kiosk, dovecote, iron gates & swimming pool, plans & elevations, 1937–38 [PA484/10(1-18)]
Cornwell House (Manor), design for conversion of old school to village hall, 1938 [PA484/11(1-5)]
Cumnor
Design for house, for Leslie Brooke, plans & elevations, 1923 [PA432/4(1-2)] (possibly Hurstcote, if executed)
Sketch design for cottage & garages, for Leslie Brooke, 1923 [PA485/2(1-2)]
Design for cottage, for Miss Earp, 1923 [PA485/3] (Cutt’s End?)
Design for cottage & garage, Cuts End [PA485/6]
Design for cottages, plan & elevation, 1906–07 [PA485/4(1-3)]
Alternative designs for alterations & additions to a house, survey drawing, for Miss Dougal, 1911 [PA485/5(1-7)]
Design for "The Milefield", plan & perspective, for Miss Hughes [PA485/7]

- Eynsham: Highcroft House, extension

Kidmore End
Cross Farm, design for alterations & additions, 1937 [PA429/19(1-33)]
Cross Farm, design for alterations & additions, for Gerald Griffiths, 1925 [PA429/20(1-3)]
Nettlebed
Design for a house [PA475/2]
Orchard Lea
Gardener's Lodge, verso "Dryden Lodge", 1908 [PA469/3]
Oxford
Cottage, Davenant Road, design for Miss Earp & Miss Dougall, 1923 [PA469/7]
Design for a house, for Mrs. Wood, 1925 [PA469/8(1-2)]
Design for a house, scheme B, 1910 [PA469/9]
Design for gardener's cottage, Cumnor Hill, for Mrs. Venables, 1910 [PA469/10] (possibly at 77 or 39 Cumnor Hill)
Design for gardener's cottage, Foxcombe Hill, plan [PA469/11]
Home for feeble-minded girls, Cumnor Rise, design, ca. 1914 [PA469/12(1-8)]
University College, pavilion of groundsmen's cottage, design, ca. 1920 [PA469/13(1-4)]
Christ Church College, detail of library front [PA469/14]
Wardington
Manor, design for cloister [PA440/11]

- Wardington: Manor, Alterations

=== Shropshire ===
Hatton Grange
Park Temple, 1968 [PA428/6(1-8)]
Circular temple, sketch design [PA428/7]
Knighton
Bournville Housing Society, design for pair of bungalows, 1920 [PA488/11]
Longden Manor
Cottage [PA480/6]
Longner Hall
Design for alterations, survey drawing [PA480/7]
Quatt
Memorial cross, design, elevation & details, 1920 [PA441/10(1-3)]
Shotton Hall
Design for alterations [PA442/12]
Atcham
Mytton & Mermaid Hotel, Main Road, design for hotel sign board [PA442/13]
Mytton & Mermaid Hotel, seating design & lettering layout [PA474/8(1-2)]
Wellington
Wrekin College, design for laboratory & dormitory block, plans & elevation, 1925 [PA440/20(1-3)]

=== Somerset ===
Burnham-on-Sea
Design for Steart House, plans & elevation, 1920 [PA431/9(1-6)]
Cricket Saint Thomas
Design for pair of cottages, for F. J. Fry, 1906 [PA484/20(1-4)]
Curry Mallet
Design for additions to manor house [PA485/8(1-2)]
Quantoxhead
Kilve House, survey drawing & design for alterations, 1920 [PA441/9(1-3)]

Weston super Mare
House (with Lionel Brett)

=== Surrey ===
Albury Park
The Half Moon, elevation & plan, 1920 [PA485/22]
Ashtead
Victoria Works [PA486/2(1-12)]
Byfleet
Design for Clock House, roof over cowshed, 1905 [PA432/2]
Chiddingfold
Old Pickhurst [PA432/13(1-4)]
Old Pickhurst: FS banister details [PA472/8]
Chipstead
Design for additions to "Sopess" Mark Edge Lane, for W. I. Turner, 1925 [PA432/16(1-6)]
Compton
Design for a pair of cottages for Mrs. Watts, plan & elevations, 1912 [PA484/6(1-4)]
Design for additions to the gallery for Mrs. Watts, ca. 1912 [PA484/7]
Hackbridge
Design for dog quarantine station, plan [PA483/6(1-2)]
Hindhead
Stonycrest, design for alterations & conversion of garage to nurses quarters, 1924 [PA428/14(1-3)]
Lower Kingswood
Mulberry Cottage, design for bungalow, porch, 1925, for Falconer Wallace & design for addition, 1936 [PA428/18(1-6)]
Mulberry Cottage, design for hot water, heating & domestic supply, 1923 [PA428/19(7-8)]
Newlands House
Design for alterations & additions, plans & details [PA475/4(1-12)]
Newland's Corner
Design for alterations, for G. H. Clark, 1926 [PA475/5(1-18)]
Design for garage & chauffeur's cottage, for J. St. Loe Strachey, 1925 [PA475/6(1-5)]
Design for tea house, for Captain Long, 1924 [PA475/7]
Little Newlands
Design for thatched house with shutters, 1915 [PA475/8]
Design for a house (also called Harrow Hill Copse), for J. St. Loe Strachey, 1926 [PA475/9(1-21)]
Peaslake
Hurtwood School, design, 1933 [PA469/17(1-28)]
Shamley Green
Design for additions to house [PA442/9(1-2)]
Shere
Pise House or Pise Hall, plan & elevation [PA442/11(1-2)]
Stapledown
Design for addition [PA442/18(1-12)]
Design for cottage, plans, elevations & details, 1931 [PA442/19(1-4)] (The Tree House, Staple Lane, Shere, GU5 9TE)
Walton Heath
Design for detached cottage, plan & elevations [PA440/10(1-2)]
West Clandon
Sarisberie, design for additions, plan & elevations [PA432/18]
Westcott
Milton Court, survey drawings, 1927 [PA440/22(1-3)]
Wisley
Memorial garden & pavilion, site plan, elevation & section [PA440/26(1-3)]
Woking
Design for house, by W. J. Wells, 1913 [PA440/27(1-2)]
Maybury Cottage, plan [PA437/7]

=== Sussex ===
Bolney
Design for proposed cottage for Edward Huth [PA488/7]
Bosham, near Chichester
Design for house, for J. H. Figg [PA488/8(1-9)]
Bosham Hoe, near Chichester
Design for house at the Creek, for Lady Allen [PA488/9(1-12)]
Bosham, near Chichester
Design for semi-detached house, plan & elevation [PA488/10]
Chichester
Funtingdon Lodge, design for addition, for George Booth, 1927 [PA432/12(1-7)]
Fittleworth
Little Bognor House, design for stone loggia in garden, for Lt. General Sir Ivor Maxse, 1925 [PA482/4(1-7)]
Little Bognor House, design for garden terrace, for the Hon. Mrs. Maxse, 1914 [PA482/4(8)]
War memorial seat, Hesworth Common [PA428/9]
Littlehampton
Design, unexecuted, for houses, Kingston Gorse Estate [PA429/6(1-3)]
Mayfield
Design for cottage, for Miss Fuller [PA473/21(1-8)]
Pashley Manor, near Ticehurst
Design, 1925 [PA469/16(1-2)]
Petworth
War memorial cross, design, 1919 [PA472/7]
Playden
Design for alterations [PA473/2(1-2)]
Design for a house, for Mrs. A. Ticehurst, elevations & section, 1913 [PA473/3(1-3)]

=== Warwickshire ===
Bishops Itchington
Design for pair of cottages, for Sir Michael Lakin Burt, 1914, & design for group of 7 cottages [PA486/9(1-5)]
Eathorpe
Group of 7 cottages, for the Rt. Hon. the Earl of Clonmell, sketch plan & details [PA481/13(1-3)]
Guy's Cliffe
Design for cottages, for Lord Algernon Percy, plan & elevation, 1908 [PA440/14(1-2)]
Harbury
Design for Manager's House [PA428/2]
Design for pair of cottages, for Sir M. Lakin [PA428/3(1-2)]
Wolverton Court
Design for alterations & additions, plan, elevations & details [PA437/8(1-4)]
Cottages, design for alterations & additions [PA437/9]
Wroxall Abbey
Design for garden house & drawing of school as built in 1912 [PA437/14(1-2)]

- Wroxall Abbey: Gates

Design for rebuilding Warren Farm, 1912 [PA437/15(1-3)]

=== Wiltshire ===
Oare
Design for a block of 6 cottages, for Mrs. G. Fry, 1926 [PA469/1]
Design for parsonage, unexecuted, 1924 [PA469/2]
The Dower House (Cold Blow), design, 1921 [PA475/10(1-5)]
Oare House, design, 1921–22 [PA475/11(1-4)]
Design for 2 cottages, for Geoffrey Fry, 1924 [PA475/12(1-3)]
Design for Apple & Garden House, 1924 [PA475/14]
Additions to Oare Pennings [PA475/13(1-2)]
Cold Blow, design for stable block, garage & groom's cottage [PA484/4]
Pewsey
Frys Farm, design for alterations, 1923 [PA482/7]
Pill Hill, (?Whiteparish, or Highclere)
Design for a house, for Miss Poore, sketch plan, plans, elevations & details & design for shed, 1927 [PA472/9(1-18)]
Design for Chauffeur's cottage, for Miss Poore, 1927 [PA472/10]
Salisbury
Wilsford Manor, design for heating chamber, 1922 [PA442/7]
Design for additions to house in the Close

=== Yorkshire ===
Dunwood House, Woodmansey
Trinities of London Ltd., design for additions, for Mr. & Mrs. G. Wiles, 1961 [PA481/9(1-20)]
Rotherham
Peter Stubbs Works, main gateway [PA442/4]
Woodmansey
Survey drawing, by Elsworth Sykes & Partners, for G. Wiles, 1963 [PA437/13]

== France ==
=== Île-de-France ===
Paris
British pavilion, 1925 exhibition, design [PA469/15(1-7)]

== Guernsey ==
Castle Carey, design for pavilion, plan & elevation, 1961 [PA432/6(1-7)]
Castle Carey, design for obelisk, draft plan & elevations, 1961 [PA432/7(8-9)]
Castle Carey, design for steps from sitting room, schemes A & B, site plan, 1959 [PA432/8(1-11)]
Castle Carey, design for house, for Dr. W. Winch, plans, elevations, section & perspectives, 1962 [PA432/9(1-4)]
Lancresse Bay, Martello tower, survey drawings, for Mrs. Winch, 1963 [PA429/1]

== Netherlands ==
=== Gelderland ===
Ede
Lunteren, Design for "Landhuis", plan & elevations [PA480/7A]

== Northern Ireland ==
=== County Antrim ===
Belfast
First Church of Christ Scientist, perspective by Philip Dalton Hepworth (1888–1963), photograph of original drawing, original exhibited at RA in 1923 [PA487/1(1)]
First Church of Christ Scientist, Sunday School, caretaker's cottage, plans, elevations, & details of furniture, 1922–35 [PA487/1(2-73)]
Bushmills
School, preliminary design& design, 1919 [PA431/13(1-2)]
School, design, elevations, 1925 [DR133/1(1-10)]
School, design, plan, elevation & layout, 1923, proposed latrines & playsheds, drainage, 1924, proposed war memorial & gardens, 1925 [PA431/14(1-16)]
School, proposed sewage purification & disposal system, latrines & playsheds, by Tuke & Bell [PA431/15(17-18)]
School, latrines, 1913, plan of drains, details of entrance piers, classroom block, plans, elevations, sections & details, school fittings by Bennet Furnishing Co. Ltd., Glasgow [PA431/16(19-30)]
School, proposed additions to Beuview, 1922–26, for Sir Malcolm MacNaughton [PA432/1(1-12)]
Giants Causeway, Design for entrance gates, site plan, plans, for the National Trust, 1960–61 [PA482/18(1-6)]
Giants Causeway, Design for development, site plan on O.S. map, for the National Trust, 1961 [PA2044/3]
Giants Causeway, Lord MacNaughten's Memorial Hall & School, design, plan, elevation & perspective, 1914 [PA483/1(1-10)]
Cushendun
Glenmona House 1923
New Lodge, Glenmona, design, 1913 [PA485/9(1-6)]
Public Hall & Club, design, 1912 [PA485/10(1-3)]
Design for cottages for square (print) [PA485/11(1-2)]
Design for block of 4 cottages, 1926 [PA485/12(1-3)]
Design for 4 terraced cottages (print) [PA485/13]
Design for shop, for Mr. A. McAlister [PA485/14(1-3)]
Portballintrae
Runkerry, FS details [PA442/6]

== Republic of Ireland ==
=== County Cork ===
Glengariff
Design for house for Lady Katherine Somerset [PA483/3]

== Scotland ==
=== Aberdeenshire ===
Arbuthnott
Design for proposed library & recreation hall, sketch plan [PA485/25]

== South Africa ==
=== KwaZulu-Natal ===
Design for a thatched pise house Type A/1, for Major Baylay, [PA436/17]

== Wales ==
=== Blaenau Gwent ===
Ebbw Vale
Plas Parc, Perspective [PA473/1]
General Manager's House, sketch plan [PA482/1]

=== Bridgend ===
Porthcawl
Design for a house on estate [PA443/2]
Layout of Dan-y-Graig estate, 1935 [PA443/3]
Design for a house, scheme B & joinery details [PA443/4(1-3)]

=== Cardiff ===
Lisvane
The Dingle [PA429/5]

=== Carmarthenshire ===
Carmarthen
Town Bridge 1937-8
Llanegwad
Brechfa, House, for Cyril Joynson, plans, elevations & sections, 1909 [PA431/2(1-5)] and Stable Block

=== Conwy ===
Abergele
Coed Coch, plans, elevations & details [PA483/8(1-17)]
Coed Coch Memorial Hall, plan & perspective, 1919 [PA484/1(1-7)]
Bro Garmon
Conwy Falls, Design for cottage entrance to Conway Falls [PA484/8]
Conwy Falls, Design for cafe & dwelling, ca. 1955 [PA484/9(1-2)]
Conwy Falls, Design for cafe & sewage disposal plant, layout & perspective, 1938–56 [PA484/9(3-6)]
Capel Curig
Design for house "Cerdd-Dy", for Mrs. P. E. Lewis, 1959 [PA432/5(1-2)]
Colwyn Bay
Design for improvements to Station Road, plans & elevations (prints) [PA484/5(1-3)]
Conwy
Deganwy, Coed y castell, Design for house inscribed "Talbot", ca. 1930s [PA433/16]
Deganwy, Coed y Castell, Design for house, for Dr Talbot, plan & elevation [PA435/9]
- Deganwy, Coed y Castell, house for Dr and Mrs Talbot
Llandudno
Craigside: Design for unidentified house on Bryn-y-Bia Road to Colwyn Bay from Llandudno, site plan [PA433/19]
Design for a house, for Miss Wilkinson [PA480/9(1-5)]
- Sheraton, Craig y Don
Llanddoged and Maenan
Maenan Hall, Sun Pavilion, designs by Henry Hope & Sons Ltd., 1963 [PA473/18(1-3)]
Llanfair Talhaiarn
design for alterations to Garthewin, plans [PA473/4]
Pentrefoelas
Voelas, Design for screen wall & permanent canopy, 1959–60 [PA440/9(1-5)]
Village hall, design, plan, 1960 [PA472/6]
- Voelas, New House
Rhos on Sea
- House

=== Denbighshire ===
Llanelidan
Nantclwyd Hall, Design, for Sir Vivian Naylor-Leyland, 1956–74 [PA474/9(1-43)]
Nantclwyd Hall, Design for alterations & additions to garden cottage [PA475/1]
Nantclwyd Hall, New bridge [PA475/15]
Cwm Farm house, design, plans & elevation, 1966 [PA480/10]
Design for cottages, 1966 [PA480/11]
Design for pair of bungalows, plan & elevation (print), 1966 [PA480/12]
Leyland Arms, design for alterations, 1966 [PA480/13(1-4)]
Church, survey drawings, 1960 [PA480/14(1)]
Church, design for alterations (print), 1938 [PA480/14(2)]
Llanferres
Maeshafn, Design for a hostel, plan & elevation [PA436/22(1-3)]
Rhuddlan
Bodrhyddan Hall, Design for entrance gates, elevation & full size details of freestone capitals, 1959 [PA488/4]

=== Flintshire ===
Nannerch
Penbedw, Design for house, 1954–56 [PA469/18(1-4)]
Penbedw, Design for house, for Miss Venetia Buddicom, 1954–55 [PA469/19(1-3)]

=== Gwynedd ===
Aberdaron
Y Gegin Fawr, design for proposed ?oathouse [PA485/17]
- Old Post Office
- Y Rhiw, Plas yn Rhiw, restoration
Aberdyfi
Brynawelon, plan & perspective, 1960 [PA485/16]
Arthog
Cwm Pennant, Tyddyn Mawr Farm, design for water supply scheme, for William Owen, 1953 [PA481/1]

- Beddgelert: Snowdonia Forest Park Campsite Hall

Betws Garmon
Snowdon, Summit, design for restaurant (known as Snowdon Cafe), 1934 [PA442/15(1-3)], demolished 2006 to make way for new building
Brithdir and Llanfachreth
Braich y Ceunant: Design for alterations & additions to house [PA431/1]
Design for alterations to Nannau, 1934 [PA481/8(1-23)]
Criccieth
Old Church Corner [PA484/12]
Home of rest, design for alterations & additions, 1914 [PA484/13(1-3)]
G. F. S. Home, details, 1914 [PA484/14]
Design for Memorial Hall [PA484/15]
Design for development scheme for part of Lady Megan Lloyd George's land, layout plan, 1965 [PA484/16]
Design for residential development, Pwllheli Road, site plan & contract drawing, in association with R. W. Evans, 1964 [PA484/18(1-4)]
- Morannedd Café (later Dylan's), Esplanade, c.1948
Dolbenmaen
Wern Estate, Design for cottage type 1, plan & elevation, 1907 [PA440/21(1-2)]
Pentrefelin, Parsonage, design & contract drawing, 1912 [PA443/6(1-2)]
Pentrefelin, Open air school, design [PA472/2]
Pentrefelin, Church hall, design, plan, elevation & perspective, 1933 [PA472/3(1-11)]
Pentrefelin, House, design, for Mr O Owens at Bronygadair, 1934 [PA472/4]
Design for a house, parsonage [PA472/5(1-2)]
Dolgellau
Garthmyn: Design for a house, plan & elevations, 1966 [PA482/15]
Ffestiniog
Tanygrisiau, Power station, survey drawings, 1969 [PA439/18]
Blaenau Ffestiniog, Design for additions to Memorial cottage hospital, 1934 [PA488/3(1-5)]
- Blaenau Ffestiniog Memorial Hospital 1923
Llanaelhaearn
Coed Ty, Design for alterations, plans & elevation, 1958 [PA484/2(1-2)]
Llanbedrog,
Porth Bedrog, Design for restaurant, shop & bedroom accommodation [PA443/1]
Glyn-y-Weddw, Design for approach & restaurant [PA483/4(1-4)]
- Porth Bedrog, Layout and three houses on the Glyn-y-Weddw Estate
Llandderfel
Bryn Derw, Design for reconstruction to house, plans & elevation, 1966 [PA431/6]
Rhiwlas, Staircase details, 1954 & design for a pair of china cabinets, 1957 [PA441/11(1-3)]
Detail of French windows to new rooms (print), 1954 [PA441/12]
Design for alterations to the house for Col. J. Price, plans, elevations & details, 1925–26, 1949 [PA441/13(1-14)]; 1920s alterations demolished for new house of 1949–54
Llandwrog
Groeslon, Design for village hall, plans & elevations, 1917 [PA483/5(1-3)]
Llanegryn
Peniarth, Design for pediment clock dial on south elevation, 1909
Llanengan
Abersoch, Bronheulog, Lon Garmon, Design for additions to house for F. Russell Roberts (later Bronheulog Hotel), 1920 [PA431/5(1-4)]
Abersoch, Seaside House, Penrhyn Point, 1924 [PA485/18]
Abersoch, Design for proposed house, 1906 [PA485/19]
Abersoch, Pen Craig Cottage, Aberuchaf [PA485/20]
Abersoch, Design for proposed house, sketch plan & elevation, 1920 [PA485/21]
- Abersoch, St Garmon’s Catholic Church
Llanfair
Gerddi Bluog, Design for alterations & additions, 1966–68 [PA482/17(1-8)]
Llanfihangel-y-Pennant
- Nant Gwernol, unexecuted scheme for Talyllyn Railway terminus, c.1969 [Talyllyn News March 1969]
Llanfrothen
Plas Brondanw, Design for reconstruction, unexecuted, survey plans, plans, elevations & perspective, design for alterations to gatehouse, 1962 [PA472/11(1-42)]
Plas Brondanw, Belvedere, design, 1913 [PA472/12]
Plas Brondanw, Brondanw Tower, Window details, by Henry Hope & Sons Ltd., 1935 [PA472/13]
Beudy Rhiw, sketch plan, 1972 [PA473/5(1-2)]
Minafron, design for bungalow, plans & elevations, for Prof. Hugh Hunt, 1972 [PA473/6(1-6)]
Morfa Cottages, survey drawing [PA473/7]
Design for reconditioning of gatehouse, 1959 [PA473/8]
War memorial, preliminary design & design, 1922 [PA473/9(1-2)]
St Frothen's Hall, plans & elevations, 1911 [PA473/10]
Hafodty Farm house, block plan [PA473/11]
Garreg, Design for public conveniences (print), widening of road & memorial [PA482/9(1-3)]
Garreg, Design for houses, plan & elevation, 1922 [PA482/10]
Garreg, Brondanw Arms, design, plan & elevation, by Rowland Lloyd-Jones, 1903 [PA482/11(1)]
Garreg, Brondanw Arms, design for additions, 1968–72 [PA482/12(2-17)]
Garreg, Design for Nos 1 & 2 Garreg & Post Office, plan [PA482/13]
Garreg, Siop Newydd, near Brondanw Arms, site plan, plan & elevation, 1968 [PA482/14(1-2)]
Croesor, Design for field study centre, Caerffynnon cottages, site plan, plan & elevation, 1969 [PA484/21]
Croesor, Design for refurbishment of 17th century manor farm, plans & perspective, 1968 [PA484/22(1-4)]
Croesor Môr, Old Drum House & Bothery, site plan, plan & elevation, 1960 [PA484/23(1-2)]
Croesor-uchaf, Cottage & septic tank, plan, 1960 [PA485/1]
Cwm Croesor, Design for swimming pool (for school?), layout, 1969 [PA485/15]
Llannor
Penrhos, Design for front door to house, 1973 [PA469/23]
Llanystumdwy
Trefan: Design for gazebo, 1967 [PA440/6(1-4)]
Pencaenewydd, Design for cottage & house, for Miss Owen [PA469/20(1-4)], [PA469/21], [PA469/25]
Design for Lloyd George Library memorial, 1956, & design for additions to Lloyd George Museum, 1965 [PA473/13(1-3)]
Design for chapel, details [PA473/14(1-10)]
Nant-y-Glyn, design for balcony railings, 1960 [PA473/15]
Nant-y-Glyn, design for additions, for Lt. James Gresham D.S.O., site plan, plan & elevation, 1959 [PA484/17(1-2)]
- Lloyd George Museum, gates etc.
- Grave of David Lloyd George
- Tŷ Newydd: Alterations and Lodge
Maentwrog
- Tanygrisiau dam spillway viaduct on unexecuted east shore deviation of Ffestiniog Railway, c.1963
Penrhyndeudraeth

Portmeirion, Map of Snowdonia showing the location of Portmeirion [PA435/2]
Portmeirion, Dinillyn, Porthmadog, maps [PA441/1(1)]
Portmeirion, Layouts showing location of buildings, views, presscuttings [PA441/1(2-12)]
Portmeirion, Design for unidentified group of buildings with campanile [PA441/2(1)]
Portmeirion, Joinery details [PA441/2(2-3)]
Portmeirion, Unidentified designs [PA441/2(4-22)]
Portmeirion, Ironwork, various & unidentified [PA441/3(1-12)]
Portmeirion, Survey drawings & design of hotel, 1926–68 [PA443/8(1-26)]
Portmeirion, Block A, design, 1925 [PA444/1(1-5)] (Neptune)
Portmeirion, Block B, design [PA444/2(1)] (Angel)
Portmeirion, Block C, design, 1927 [PA444/2(2-4)] (Battery)
Portmeirion, The Angel, design for alterations & additions [PA444/3(1-4)]
Portmeirion, The Anchor, design [PA444/4(1)]
Portmeirion, The Arches, design, 1956 [PA444/4(2)]
Portmeirion, The Upper Arches House, design, 1954 [PA444/4(3)]
Portmeirion, The Barbican Lodge, perspective, 1966 [PA444/4(4)]
Portmeirion, Battery block, Battery Square, Belvedere, Bristol colonnade & Bridge House [PA444/5(1-3, 7–13)]
Portmeirion, Bristol, Arno's Bath House, The Colonnade, working drawings [PA444/5(4-6)]
Portmeirion, Castle Cove, Castle Cove cottages, house near Castle Gardens, Gardener's House, Castle Yard extension, Castle Yard sunroom, 1960–71 [PA444/6(1-16)]
Portmeirion, The Chantry, Chantry Lodge, Chantry Row, Cliffe House, The Crown, design [PA444/7(1-32)]
Portmeirion, The Dolphin, The Emral Hall for Portmeirion Concessions, Fountain & Fountain House, The Gloriette, Gwt Gwyn, 1926–64 [PA444/8(1-13)]
Portmeirion, Cliffe House [PA445/1(15)]
Portmeirion, Harbour Lodge, 1966, Hercules Hall [PA445/1(1-4)]
Portmeirion, Top Lodge, The Mitre, The Neptune, The Pavilion [PA445/1(5-10)]
Portmeirion, Peacock Shop, sign, design [PA445/1(11-12)]
Portmeirion, The Piazza, Pilot House [PA445/1(13-14)]
Portmeirion, Recreation Room, 1960, The Round House, 1926, The Salutation, 1965 [PA445/2(1-5)]
Portmeirion, Tower House, 1955–56 [PA445/2(6-8, 20–22)]
Portmeirion, The Bell Tower [PA445/2(9-12)]
Portmeirion, Fountain Tower House, 1962 [PA445/2(13-14, 23–24)]
Portmeirion, The Lion Tower, 1962–66 [PA445/2(15)]
Portmeirion, The Observatory Tower, 1935 [PA445/2(16-17)]
Portmeirion, The Old Tower, 1956 [PA445/2(18)]
Portmeirion, The Writer's Tower [PA445/2(19)]
Portmeirion, Vane House, Villa Winch, White Cottage, White Houses, The Winch [PA445/3(1-7)]
Portmeirion, Conference hall, Opera House, refreshment kiosk, orangery, lighthouse railing, front door, mermaid detail, Sea Lawn Bridge, substation, Vista Pagoda, plaque [PA445/4(1-12)]
Portmeirion, New House, New Place, New bedrooms, New Staff Flats, new block, bedroom additions to New Lodge, New Ladies Lavatory [PA445/5(1-18)]
Portmeirion, Studio cottage for Henry Winch, dwelling, archway end of Friday Lane [PA445/6(1-7)]
Deudraeth Castle, survey of castle & stable block, 1932, design for garden house & cottage, 1958–59, layout for walling [PA469/24(1-6)]
Lodge, design, for Dr Rees, working drawing [PA472/1]
Portmeirion, Bell tower, design, 1927 [PA479/14]
Deudraeth, Design for type of houses under Agricultural Workers Act 1931 [PA481/7(1-2)]
Portmeirion, Designs for miscellaneous buildings at Portmeirion, for Hatton Grange Park Temple & Deudraeth Castle, 195-s & 1960s (29) [RAN 54/C/2]
- Cae Canol, Coed Mor, Dorlan Goch, Three houses on Portmeirion estate
- Deudraeth Castle, Garden, 1912
- Mardir, House for Dr Rees
Porthmadog
Tremadog, Lawrence Memorial, town hall & market hall [PA440/5(1-5)]
Parsonage, plans [PA443/7]
Pwllheli
Shops, joinery details, 1935 [PA441/8]
Talsarnau
Eisingrug: Design for conversion of Seion Chapel into cottage, 1936 [PA482/2]
Tudweiliog
Design for farmhouse at Hafod Wen (later Ty Uchaf), Llangwnnadl, for Mr & Mrs L Porter, plans, elevation & section [PA441/7]

=== Isle of Anglesey ===
Llannerch-y-Medd
Coedana, Design for vicarage, 1909 [PA484/3(1-3)]
Menai Bridge
Ynys Gaint, Design for garden layout, for Guy Fison [PA437/18]
Moelfre
Trwyn Melyn, Nant Bychan, design for development, 1944 [PA440/7(1-2)]
Rhosyr
Ynys Llanddwyn, Saint Dwynwen's Priory Church, design, plans, elevations & perspective, 1906 [PA480/8]

=== Monmouthshire ===
Llantilio Crossenny
Llantilio Estate, Workmen's cottage, for Sir H. Mather-Jackson, 1913 [PA473/17(1-2)]
Monmouth
Hunt Club, lodges for huntsman & stud-groom, 1907 [PA474/6]

=== Pembrokeshire ===
Martletwy
Lawrenny, Knowles Farm, design for alterations (drawing room), 1956 [PA429/4]
Milford Haven
Design for house, for Mrs. M. Chadwick, 1936 [PA474/3]
St David's and the Cathedral Close
- Alterations to house, Tower Hill

=== Powys ===
Llyswen
Llangoed Hall (originally Llangoed Castle). Design, contract & working drawings for alterations & additions to house & outbuildings & garden house, 1913 [PA473/12(1-20)]
Design for alterations, 1913 [PA473/16(1-27)]
Erwood
Crickadarn, Church of Saint Mary, design for alterations, elevations, sections & details 1914 [PA484/19(1-2)]
Presteigne
Broad Heath House, design for alterations & additions, for Misses Coates, survey drawings & site plan, 1909 [PA441/4(1-17)]

=== Unidentified in Wales ===
Caernarfonshire
Design for small house, plans & elevations (print), 1935 [PA436/12(1-2)]
Porth Gwerbert
Design for camp, ablution blocks, 1958 [PA443/5(1-2)] (Possibly Gwbert, Ceredigion)
Traeth
Cottage, design, plan & perspective [PA440/4] (Possibly in Gwynedd)
Tyn-y-Mos
Joinery details, 1955 [PA440/8]

== United States ==
=== New York ===
New York City
Elevation of 2 masted yacht, Burgess, Rigg & Morgan Ltd for George Draper [PA434/10(2)]
Details of marine fitments, Burgess, Rigg & Morgan Ltd, 1927 [PA434/10(1)]

== Unknown locations and speculative schemes ==
Design for a pavilion or gazebo, perspective, 1912 [PA433/1]
Design for a belvedere [PA433/2(1-2)]
Design for a monument, 1958 [PA433/3(1-2)]
Design for a monument, for Hilda Mary Greaves (d. 1927), design for tombstone for Cowen Hughes (d. 1937), design for memorial marked "A" & 1922 in roundel, design for tombstone of war grave, 1919, design for memorial plaques, design for monument urn, 1964, design for cartouches [PA433/5(1-14)]
Design for 6 or 8 light candelabra in wood [PA433/6(1-3)]
Design for dolls house [PA433/7(1-2)]
Design for 3 fireplaces, 1920 [PA433/8]
Design for fountain, detail [PA433/9]
Design for a garden gate, detail, 1922 [PA433/10]
Design for yard gates, elevation & detail, 1975 [PA433/11]
Design for wrought iron grille, 1954 [PA433/12(1-2)]
Design for house, 1910 [PA433/13]
Design for house to cost Ð4329, 1924 [PA433/14]
Design for house in neo-Georgian style with Regency capping to front door asymmetrically placed [PA433/15]
Design for house & garden [PA433/17]
Design for a ladies lavatory in the style of a grotto, drawn on the verso of a print for a design for a garden seat [PA433/20]
Design for a war memorial cross [PA433/21]
Design for model cases, 1925 [PA433/22(1-2)]
Design for upright pianoforte, 1928 [PA434/1(1-5)]
Design for ventilating radiators by H. Hope & Sons & "Ideal radiators" by Musgrave & Co. Ltd. [PA434/2]
Design for a septic tank & filter bed, 1959 [PA434/3]
Design for urn in cast iron, 1958 [PA434/4(1-2)]
Design for memorial urn, 1959 [PA434/5]
Design for urn [PA434/6]
Design for water filtration plant [PA434/8]
Design for well head [PA434/9]
Design for writing table [PA434/11(1)]
Design for 2 bedside tables [PA434/11(2)]
Fragmentary drawings [PA434/12]
Design for a plinth, 1955 [PA435/1]
Collection of miscellaneous uncatalogued drawings, temporarily unavailable [PA434/13(1-9)]
Design for garden house, 1963 & design for garden loggia, 1963 [PA435/4(1-2)]
Design for lodges, plan & elevation, 1959 [PA435/5]
Design for piggeries, for Board of Agriculture & Fisheries, plan & elevation [PA435/6]
Design for a house, for Leslie Croome, plan, elevation & section [PA435/7]
Design for house, for Dr. Davidson (print) [PA435/8]
Design for concrete houses, types 2 & 2A, for British Portland Cement Ltd. (print) [PA435/10]
Design for homestead designed for mixed farm of 300 or 400 acres, plan & elevation, 1908 [PA435/11(1-2)]
Design for house & buildings for small-holding, plan, elevation & perspective, 1911 [PA435/12]
Design for seaside house, 1925 [PA435/13]
Design for House on the Hill [PA435/14]
Design for typical Type P house, site plan, plan, elevation & section, 1953 (print) [PA436/1(1-2)]
Design for 1000 guinea country house, plans & perspective [PA436/2]
Design for a house to cost Ð1000, plan, elevation & perspective [PA436/3]
Design for a small house to cost Ð500, cubic contents 17000ft., plan, elevation, interior & exterior perspectives & garden layout [PA436/4]
Design for Ministry housing, type 6 & 14, plans (prints) [PA436/5(1-2)]
Design for house, plans & elevations [PA436/6]
Design for large house, plans & elevations [PA436/7]
Design for a house & garden, site plan, 1922 [PA436/8]
Design for a country house [PA436/9(1-5)]
Design for house, plans, elevation & perspective [PA436/10]
Design for house with tower plan [PA436/11]
Design for house, plans & elevations, 1918 [PA436/13]
Design for house, plans & perspective [PA436/14]
Design for house & garages, plans, elevation & section [PA436/15]
Design for a 5 bedroom house in neo-Georgian style with hipped roof [PA436/16]
Design for pise houses, types 2, 3, 4 & 5, design for a 5-room pise bungalow type G, design for a thatched 7 bedroom pise house, types A/1 & A/2 [PA436/18(1-15)]
Design for a country house, plan & elevation [PA436/19]
Design for an unidentified house [PA436/20]
Design for The Salutation hotel & restaurant, plan & perspective, 1922 [PA436/21]
Design for an unidentified cottage, plan & front elevation, 1966 [PA437/2]
Sketch design of classical facade [PA437/3(1)]
Sketch design of classical facade [PA437/3(2)]
Design for cookery & manual (?) furniture for 20 students, for the Midland Educational Ltd., 1912 [PA437/4]
Design for crown doorhood, 1961 [PA437/5(1-2)]
Sketch designs for interiors & restaurant sign [PA437/6(1-6)]
Design for an unidentified two-storey bungalow to cost £1100, plan, elevation & perspective [PA437/20]
Design for unidentified bungalow, plan & perspective, 1912 [PA437/21]
Diagram showing inflexible angle braces of reinforced concrete, 1972 [PA438/1]
Design for an unidentified cottage "Piper's Piece", for Miss Price, plan, 1920 [PA438/2(1-2)]
Design for an unidentified cottage "West Prospect Gell", plan & perspective [PA438/3]
Design for unidentified bungalow, plan, elevation & section [PA437/19]
Design for a pair of cottages type A (issued by the Festiniog District State Quarry Owners Association) & Type B (print) [PA438/4(1-4), PA438/20(1-3)]
Design for detached All-slate cottage Type D, Type E, (issued by the Festiniog District State Quarry Owners Association) [PA438/5(1-5)]
Design for a pair of small cottages, Type D & Type E [PA438/6(1-2), PA438/21]
Design for a block of 4 cottages, plans, & elevation, 1906 [PA438/7]
Designs for a pair of small-holders cottages, plan & elevation, 1919 [PA438/8(1-2)]
Design for a tiny cottage in Wrenaissance style, dormers in roof & steps up to front door [PA438/9]
Design for a group of 4 cottages, inscribed "Eaeth Close" [PA438/10]
Design for a block of 2 small-holders cottages, series B, plan, elevation & section [PA438/11(1-3)]
Design for a single cottage for a small-holder, & single storey cottage for a small-holder, & design for bungalow cottage Type A1, plans, elevations & sections [PA438/12(1-3)]
Design for detached brick & thatch cottage, plans & details [PA438/13(1-4)]
Design for a pair of labourer's cottages, plan, elevation & perspective [PA438/14(1-2)]
Design for a pair of labourer's cottages, Blocks A-C, North Wales, 1905 [PA438/15(1-3)]
Design for a detached cottage for a labourer, plan, elevation & perspective, ca. 1913 [PA438/16]
Design for a small cottage, Montgomeryshire type & Northumberland type, plan & elevation [PA438/17(1-2)]
Design for "Welsh cottage", plans & elevations [PA438/18(1-2)]
Design for a small single cottage, "100 guineas cottage", plan, elevation & details [PA438/19(1-2)]
Design for a small single cottage (print) [PA439/1(1-2)]
Design for a small single cottage [PA439/2]
Design for a pair of subsidy cottages, plans & elevation, 1924 [PA439/3]
Design for a 2-storey cottage, plan & elevation [PA439/4]
Design for a 6-room pise cottages, Type 1, design for a 7-room pise cottage type D & design for a 5-room pise cottage type E [PA439/5(1-4)]
Design for conversion of garden house, for Charles Piggott [PA439/6]
Full scale details of Brancolor (?) partitions, post & lintels, by Art Pavements & Decorations Limited [PA486/4]

== Unidentified locations ==
Castle Main
Design for alterations [PA432/10]
Frampton Court (possibly Frampton-on-Severn, Gloucestershire)
Design for alterations, 1909 [PA482/5(1-8)]
Freshfield Farm
Design for alterations (print) [PA482/6(1-2)]
Hazelwood: 1914 [PA428/8(1-2)]
Matthews Point (possibly Stoke Fleming, Devon)
Design for alterations to gardens, 1920 [PA473/20]
Wotton House
(probably either Surrey or Buckinghamshire)
Gardener's Bothy, plan, elevation & section, 1909 [PA437/12]
Warren (possibly Warren Farm, Wroxall Abbey, Warwickshire)
Farm house, plan & elevations, 1912 [PA440/13(1-3)]
