= Gorsedd (disambiguation) =

Gorsedd (plural Gorseddau) normally refers to:

- Gorsedd Cymru, community of Welsh bards

It may also refer to:

- Goursez Vreizh, community of Breton bards
- Gorsedh Kernow, community of Cornish bards
- Gorsedd, Flintshire, Wales, a village in the community of Whitford, North Wales

Gorseddau may also refer to:

- Gorseddau, Gwynedd, a village and former slate quarry in North Wales
- Gorseddau Tramway, former (1857–1872) 3 ft (914 mm) gauge railway to the quarry
- Gorseddau Junction and Portmadoc Railway, former (1875–1887) 2 ft (610 mm) gauge railway to the quarry
