= List of burial places of prime ministers of the United Kingdom =

This is a list of burial places of prime ministers of the United Kingdom.

Prime ministers are typically buried or interred in a place associated with them or, traditionally, their aristocratic family seat. Eight prime ministers have been buried in Westminster Abbey, and several more have declined that honour; 14 prime ministers have been buried in London (and only one, the Duke of Wellington, in the City of London, in St Paul's Cathedral). The majority of prime ministers (40) have been buried in England, with six in Scotland, and one, David Lloyd George, in Wales. All prime ministers have been buried on the British mainland except two, John Stuart, 3rd Earl of Bute and Harold Wilson. Eight prime ministers who held office in the 20th century were cremated before their ashes were buried or scattered elsewhere.

== List ==
Name	Place of burial or interment	Image
Sir Robert Walpole (1676–1745)	Church of St Martin, Houghton, Norfolk	St Martin of Tours, Houghton
Spencer Compton, 1st Earl of Wilmington (1673–1743)	The Estate Chapel, Compton Wynyates, Warwickshire	Compton Wynyates
Henry Pelham (1694–1754)	All Saints' Church, Laughton, East Sussex	All Saints Church, Laughton
Thomas Pelham-Holles, 1st Duke of Newcastle (1693–1768)	All Saints' Church, Laughton, East Sussex	All Saints Church, Laughton
William Cavendish, 4th Duke of Devonshire (1720–1764)	Derby Cathedral, Derby, Derbyshire	Derby Cathedral England
John Stuart, 3rd Earl of Bute (1713–1792)	Bute Mausoleum, St Mary's Chapel, Rothesay, Isle of Bute, Argyll and Bute	Bute Mausoleum
George Grenville (1712–1770)	Wotton Underwood, Buckinghamshire	All Saints church, Wotton Underwood - geograph.org.uk - 2026177
Charles Watson-Wentworth, 2nd Marquess of Rockingham (1730–1782)	York Minster, York, Yorkshire	
William Pitt the Elder, 1st Earl of Chatham (1708–1778)	Westminster Abbey, Westminster, London	
Augustus FitzRoy, 3rd Duke of Grafton (1735–1811)	St. Genevieve's Church, Euston, Suffolk	
Frederick North, Lord North (1732–1792)	All Saints' Church, Wroxton, Oxfordshire	
William Petty-FitzMaurice, 2nd Earl of Shelburne (1737–1805)	All Saints' Church, High Wycombe, Buckinghamshire	
William Cavendish-Bentinck, 3rd Duke of Portland (1738–1809)	St Marylebone Parish Church, Marylebone, London	
William Pitt the Younger (1759–1806)	Westminster Abbey, Westminster, London	
Henry Addington (1757–1844)	St Mary the Virgin, Mortlake, Richmond Upon Thames, London	
William Wyndham Grenville, 1st Lord Grenville (1759–1834)	Burnham, Buckinghamshire	
Spencer Perceval (1762–1812)	St Luke's Church, Charlton, London	
Robert Banks Jenkinson, 2nd Earl of Liverpool (1770–1828)	Parish Church of St Mary the Virgin, Hawkesbury Upton, South Gloucestershire	
George Canning (1770–1827)	Westminster Abbey, Westminster, London	
Frederick John Robinson, 1st Viscount Goderich (1782–1859)	All Saints' Church, Nocton, Lincolnshire	Remains of Nocton Hall
Arthur Wellesley, 1st Duke of Wellington (1769–1852)	St Paul's Cathedral, London	
Charles Grey, 2nd Earl Grey (1764–1845)	St Michael and all Angels Church, Howick, Northumberland	
William Lamb, 2nd Viscount Melbourne (1779–1848)	St Etheldreda's Church, Hatfield, Hertfordshire	
Sir Robert Peel (1788–1850)	St Peter's Church, Drayton Bassett, Staffordshire	
Lord John Russell (1792–1878)	St Michael's Church, Chenies, Buckinghamshire	
Edward Smith-Stanley, 14th Earl of Derby (1799–1869)	St Mary's Church, Knowsley, Merseyside	
George Hamilton-Gordon, 4th Earl of Aberdeen (1784–1860)	St John's Church, Stanmore, Harrow, London	
Henry John Temple, 3rd Viscount Palmerston (1784–1865)	Westminster Abbey, Westminster, London	
Benjamin Disraeli (1804–1881)	St Michael and All Angels Church, Hughenden, Nr High Wycombe, Buckinghamshire	
William Ewart Gladstone (1809–1898)	Westminster Abbey, Westminster, London	
Robert Gascoyne-Cecil, 3rd Marquess of Salisbury (1830–1903)	St Etheldreda's churchyard, Hatfield, Hertfordshire	
Archibald Primrose, 5th Earl of Rosebery (1847–1929)	Dalmeny churchyard, Dalmeny, City of Edinburgh	
Arthur Balfour (1848–1930)	Whittingehame Church, Whittingehame, East Lothian	
Sir Henry Campbell-Bannerman (1836–1908)	Meigle churchyard, Meigle, Perth and Kinross, Angus	
H. H. Asquith (1852–1928)	All Saints' Church, Sutton Courtenay, Oxfordshire	
David Lloyd George (1863–1945)	Grave of David Lloyd George, on a bank of the Afon Dwyfor near Llanystumdwy, Gwynedd	
Bonar Law (1858–1923)	Ashes interred at Westminster Abbey, Westminster, London	
Stanley Baldwin (1867–1947)	Ashes interred at Worcester Cathedral, Worcester, Worcestershire	
Ramsay MacDonald (1866–1937)	Ashes interred in the kirkyard of the Holy Trinity Church, Spynie, Moray	
Neville Chamberlain (1869–1940)	Ashes interred at Westminster Abbey, Westminster, London	
Winston Churchill (1874–1965)	St Martin's Church, Bladon, Oxfordshire	
Clement Attlee (1883–1967)	Ashes interred at Westminster Abbey, Westminster, London	
Sir Anthony Eden (1897–1977)	St Mary's, Alvediston, Wiltshire	
Harold Macmillan (1894–1986)	St Giles' Church, Horsted Keynes, West Sussex	
Sir Alec Douglas-Home (1903–1995)	Lennel churchyard, Coldstream, Scottish Borders	Lennel Church
Harold Wilson (1916–1995)	St Mary's Old Church, St Mary's, Isles of Scilly, Cornwall	
Edward Heath (1916–2005)	Ashes interred at Salisbury Cathedral, Salisbury, Wiltshire	
James Callaghan (1912–2005)	Ashes scattered around the base of the Peter Pan statue at Great Ormond Street Hospital for Children in London	Great Ormond Street Hospital, Peter Pan statue
Margaret Thatcher (1925–2013)	Ashes interred at Royal Hospital Chelsea, Chelsea, London	

== See also ==
- List of prime ministers of the United Kingdom
- Burial places of British royalty
