= Claudia Williams =

Claudia Williams may refer to:

- Claudia Williams (artist) (1933–2024), Welsh artist
- Claudia Williams (tennis) (born 1996), New Zealand tennis player
