= Tŷ Newydd =

Grade II* listed building in Gwynedd. National Centre for Writing in Wales

Coordinates: 52.9217°N 4.2641°W

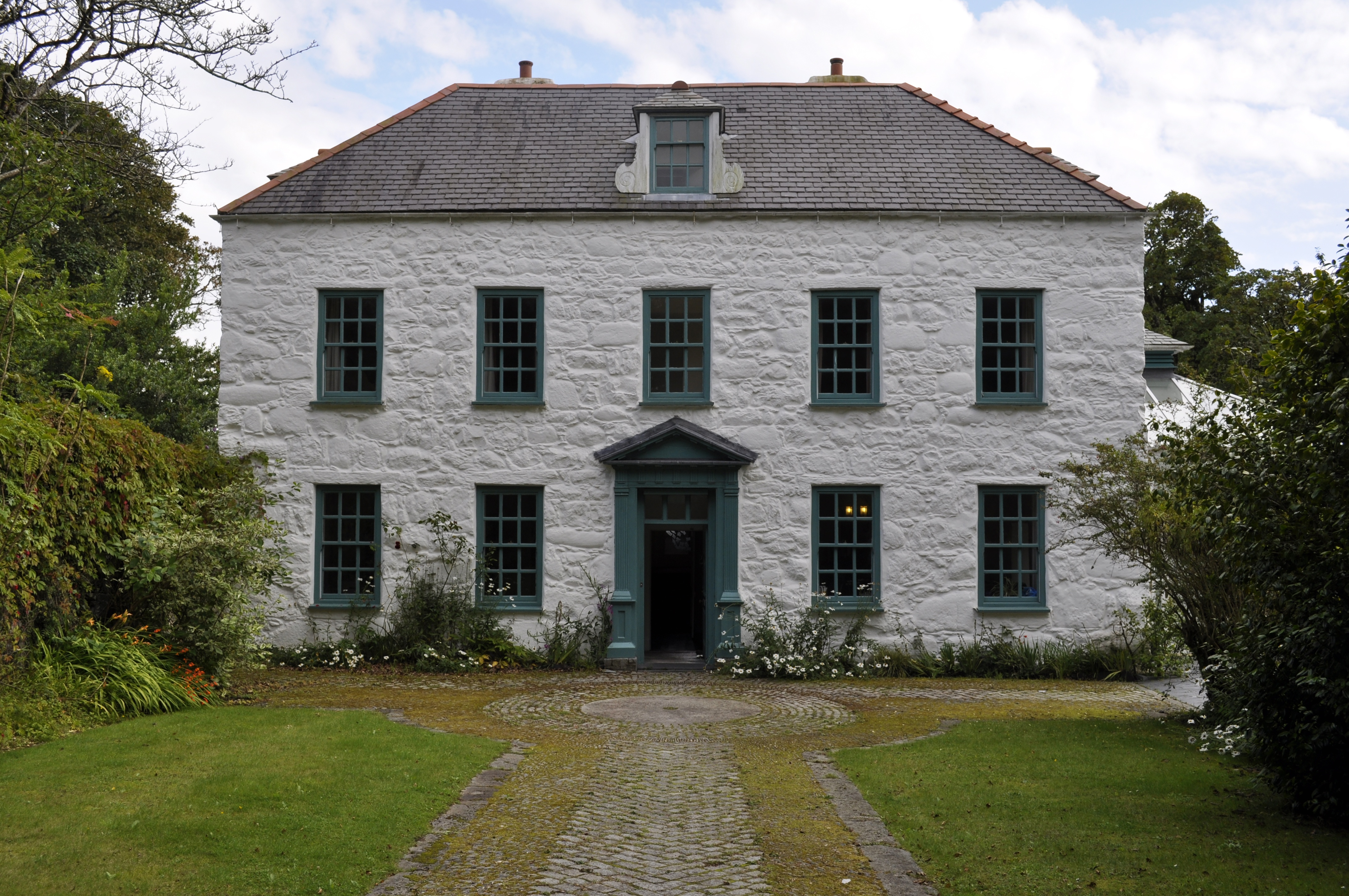
- Interactive map of Tŷ Newydd
- Associated with: David Lloyd George and Frances Stevenson (1942–1945)
- Location: Llanystumdwy, nr. Criccieth, Gwynedd, Wales

History
- Built: 16^{th} – 18^{th} centuries

Site notes
- Restored by: Clough Williams-Ellis (1945)
- Current use: National Writing Centre of Wales
- Owner: Literature Wales (since 1990)
- Website: tynewydd.wales

Listed Building – Grade II*
- Official name: Ty-newydd
- Designated: 19 October 1971
- Reference no.: 4357

Tŷ Newydd (Welsh: [ˈtɨː ˈnɛuɨð]) is a historic house in Llanystumdwy, near Criccieth, in Gwynedd, north-west Wales. Since 1990 it has housed the National Writing Centre of Wales. The centre specialises in residential creative writing and retreats. The courses are in both the English and Welsh languages, and cover many genres, forms and styles. The centre also holds regular seminars and forums.

== House ==
The Grade II* listed building was built in the fifteenth century. The name Tŷ Newydd translates literally from Welsh as 'New House'. The house has six bedrooms, a large dining room, a kitchen, a conservatory and two libraries. The outbuilding, Hafoty, is the tutors' quarters, and has six extra rooms for guests. Other architectural features of the house include a "Chinese Chippendale" balustrade, a panelled front door with fluted pilasters and a frieze, and a vaulted ceiling in the library.

David Lloyd George, the Welsh politician who served as British Prime Minister during the First World War, owned Tŷ Newydd from 1942 until his death in 1945. He had asked for his bed to be moved to the library, and died in that room.

The grounds overlook Cardigan Bay and provide a scenic setting considered conducive to literary creativity. During the 1940s these were restyled by the architect Sir Clough Williams-Ellis.

== Lloyd George period ==
David Lloyd George (17 January 1863 – 26 March 1945) was a British Liberal politician and statesman, and Prime Minister of the Wartime Coalition Government (1916–22). Lloyd George grew up in Llanystumdwy in Caernarfonshire. As a child, he was educated in the local Anglican school, Llanystumdwy National School. Tŷ Newydd was originally a farm, whose land extended to the road adjacent to Lloyd George's other home, Brynawelon. Brynawelon was later the home of his daughter Megan. In 1942, Lloyd George and his wife Frances bought Tŷ Newydd and initiated a major renovation by the architect Clough Williams-Ellis (28 May 1883 – 9 April 1978). Under his direction, new additions such as the library window and the front window finals were made. Like the rest of the house, the library extension was built of local stone rubble and externally whitewashed. In 1944 the couple moved into Tŷ Newydd. Lloyd George died in 1945, aged 82, and was buried beside the River Dwyfor in Llanystumdwy, only a short distance from the house. A monument designed by Williams-Ellis was erected around the grave. This bears an englyn (a strict-metre stanza in the Welsh language) engraved on slate in his memory, composed by his nephew Dr William George, an accomplished poet who won the crown at the National Eisteddfod in 1974.

== As a writers' centre ==
Robert Minhinnick, who, with Gillian Clarke, was a tutor on the first course run at the house after it was converted to a writers' centre, credits Sally Baker with the idea for the project. During work carried out in preparation for the opening of the centre, a medieval "post and panel" screen was discovered; it is considered the most historically significant feature of the house.
