= William George (solicitor) =

Welsh solicitor (1865–1967)

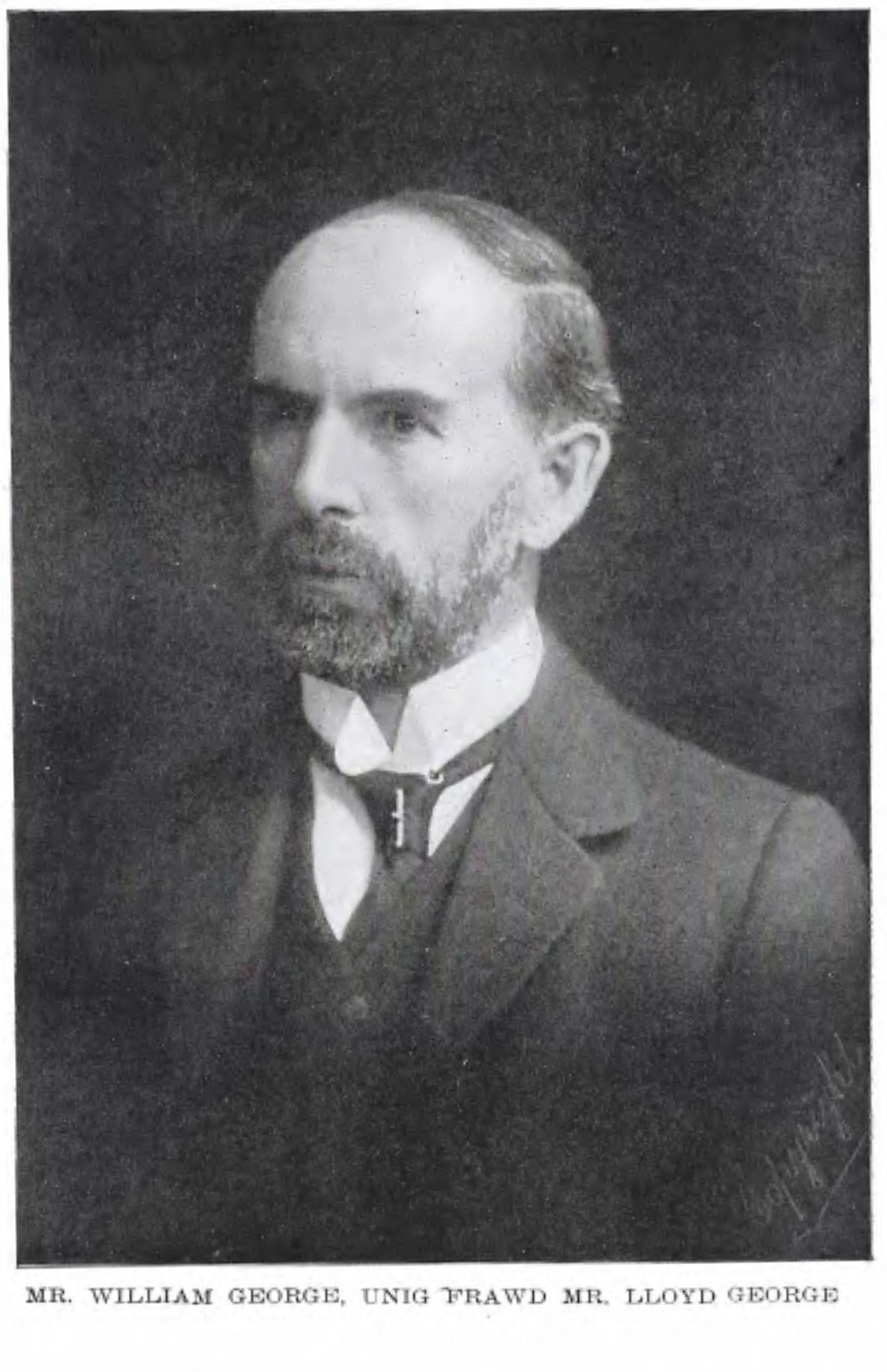
- Born: 23 February 1865; Llanystumdwy, Carnarvonshire, Wales
- Died: 25 January 1967 (aged 101); Criccieth, Caernarvonshire, Wales
- Occupations: Solicitor politician
- Spouse: Anita Williams (m. 1910; died 1943)
- Children: 2, including William
- Relatives: David Lloyd George (brother)

William George (23 February 1865 − 25 January 1967) was a Welsh solicitor and public figure who served for 60 years as a member of Caernarfonshire County Council. He was the younger brother of the Liberal Prime Minister David Lloyd George.

== Early life and education ==
George was born on 23 February 1865 at Highgate, a house in Llanystumdwy, Carnarvonshire (modern-day Gwynedd), that now forms part of the Lloyd George Museum. His father, William George, a school teacher, had died of pneumonia in June 1864. With his brother David (later Prime Minister of the United Kingdom) and his sister Mary Elin, he was brought up by his mother, Elisabeth (née Lloyd) (1828−1896), and by his uncle, Richard Lloyd, a shoemaker, Baptist minister and Liberal, who had a strong influence on the careers and outlook of both of his nephews.

George was educated at the Anglican national school in Llanystumdwy.

== Career and public life ==
Having become an articled clerk in 1882, George joined his brother David in the law partnership of Lloyd George & George in Criccieth, his brother having taken on their uncle Richard Lloyd's surname to become Lloyd George. When David entered parliament, then unpaid, William agreed to support him financially from the partnership. In 1905, David gained a salaried post as President of the Board of Trade, and William, no longer financially supporting his brother, could spend more time on public life. His son W. R. P. George wrote that "Without [William's] self-sacrifice it is difficult to see how David Lloyd George could have developed into a professional politician so early in his career. The letters between them show that David placed great importance on William's judgement on current topics".

George was a member of Caernarfonshire County Council from 1907 to 1967, being its chair in 1911. He was active in the areas of education (chair of the Education Committee from 1916 to 1948), promotion of the Welsh language (translating the National Insurance Act 1911 into Welsh with a glossary of legal terms), and co-operation between county councils. He was honorary solicitor to the National Eisteddfod of Wales from 1937 to 1956, and was elected a fellow of the Eisteddfod in 1956. He was the longest serving councillor in British history.

In 1947 he was awarded an honorary degree (D.Litt.) by the University of Wales.

George was interviewed by The Guardian in 1965 at which time, aged 99, he was still an elected member of Caernarfonshire County Council. He is quoted as never having felt attracted to participation in national politics: "He never felt the pull of national politics. 'One member of the family was quite enough; there are other ways of public service.'"

George's papers were purchased in 1989 for the National Library of Wales.

== Personal life ==
George married his cousin Anita Williams (died 1943) in 1910 in her home town of Fishguard, Pembrokeshire. The wedding drew crowds of onlookers and was described as being an event for the town "second only to the 1797 French Invasion". She had travelled widely including to Egypt in her work as a trained nurse, and was a strong chapel-goer, playing the organ and teaching in Sunday School. They had twin sons; one died at birth and the other, W. R. P. George (1912−2006), became a solicitor, writer and Archdruid.

George turned 100 in 1965 and died in Criccieth on 25 January 1967, a month short of his 102nd birthday.

== Selected publications ==
- Richard Lloyd, Cricieth (in Welsh, Western Mail a'r Echo, Cardiff, 1934) OCLC 24349383
- Atgof a Myfyr [Remembrance and Reflection] (1948, Hughes a'i Fab, Wrexham) OCLC 656768628
- My Brother and I (1958, Eyre and Spottiswoode) OCLC 4923426
