= Dolbenmaen =

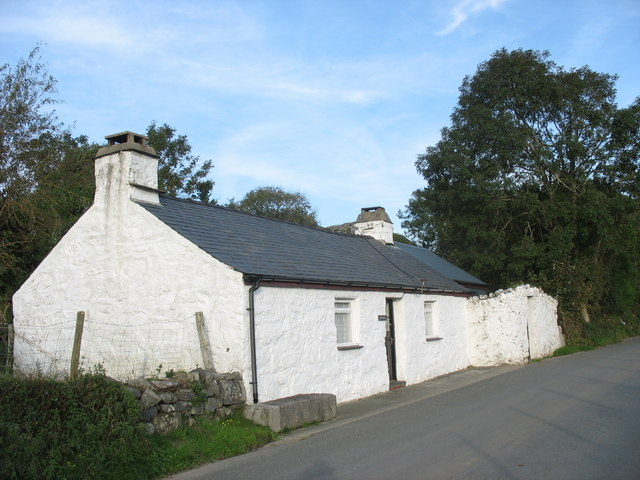
- Min y Ddol

- Location within Gwynedd
- Area: 96.40 km^{2} (37.22 sq mi)
- Population: 1,343 (2011)
  - Density: 14/km^{2} (36/sq mi)
- OS grid reference: SH506430
- Community: Dolbenmaen
- Principal area: Gwynedd
- Preserved county: Gwynedd
- Country: Wales
- Sovereign state: United Kingdom
- Post town: CRICCIETH
- Postcode district: LL49
- Post town: PORTHMADOG
- Postcode district: LL51
- Post town: GARNDOLBENMAEN
- Postcode district: LL52
- Dialling code: 01766
- Police: North Wales
- Fire: North Wales
- Ambulance: Welsh
- UK Parliament: Dwyfor Meirionnydd
- Senedd Cymru – Welsh Parliament: Gwynedd Maldwyn
- List of places UK Wales Gwynedd 52.964°N 4.224°W Map of the community

Dolbenmaen (Welsh pronunciation) is a village and community in the Welsh county of Gwynedd, located in Eifionydd, of which it was the administrative centre until 1239. The community includes the villages of Bryncir (Welsh pronunciation), Bwlch-derwin, Cenin, Garndolbenmaen, (the largest settlement) Golan, Llanfihangel-y-Pennant, Penmorfa (Welsh pronunciation), Pentrefelin, Wern, Glan-dwyfach, and the hamlet of Prenteg. It has a population of 1,300, increasing slightly to 1,343 at the 2011 Census. The summit of Moel Hebog is shared between Beddgelert and Dolbenmaen. It is a sparsely populated area and covers nearly 100 square kilometres.

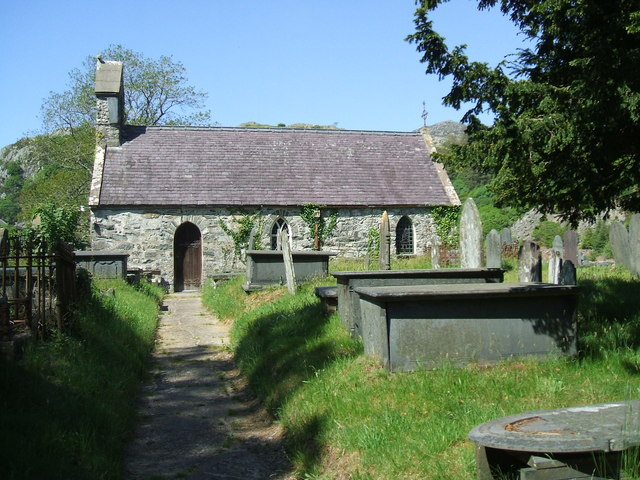
St Mary's church

A castle motte is located to the south of the village which is thought to have been the residence of Llywelyn the Great until the 1230s, when the court moved to a new castle at Criccieth. The castle guarded a ford on the Afon Dwyfor which may have been on the Pen Llystyn (Tremadog) to Segontium Roman road. The parish church of St Mary's is a grade II* listed building. South of Pentrefelin is St Cynhaearn's Church, Ynyscynhaearn.

== Governance ==
An electoral ward of the same name exists. The extent of this ward differs slightly to the Community and the total population of the ward taken at the 2011 Census was 1,212.
