= Grave of David Lloyd George =

Grade II* listed grave of David Lloyd George in Llanystumdwy, North Wales

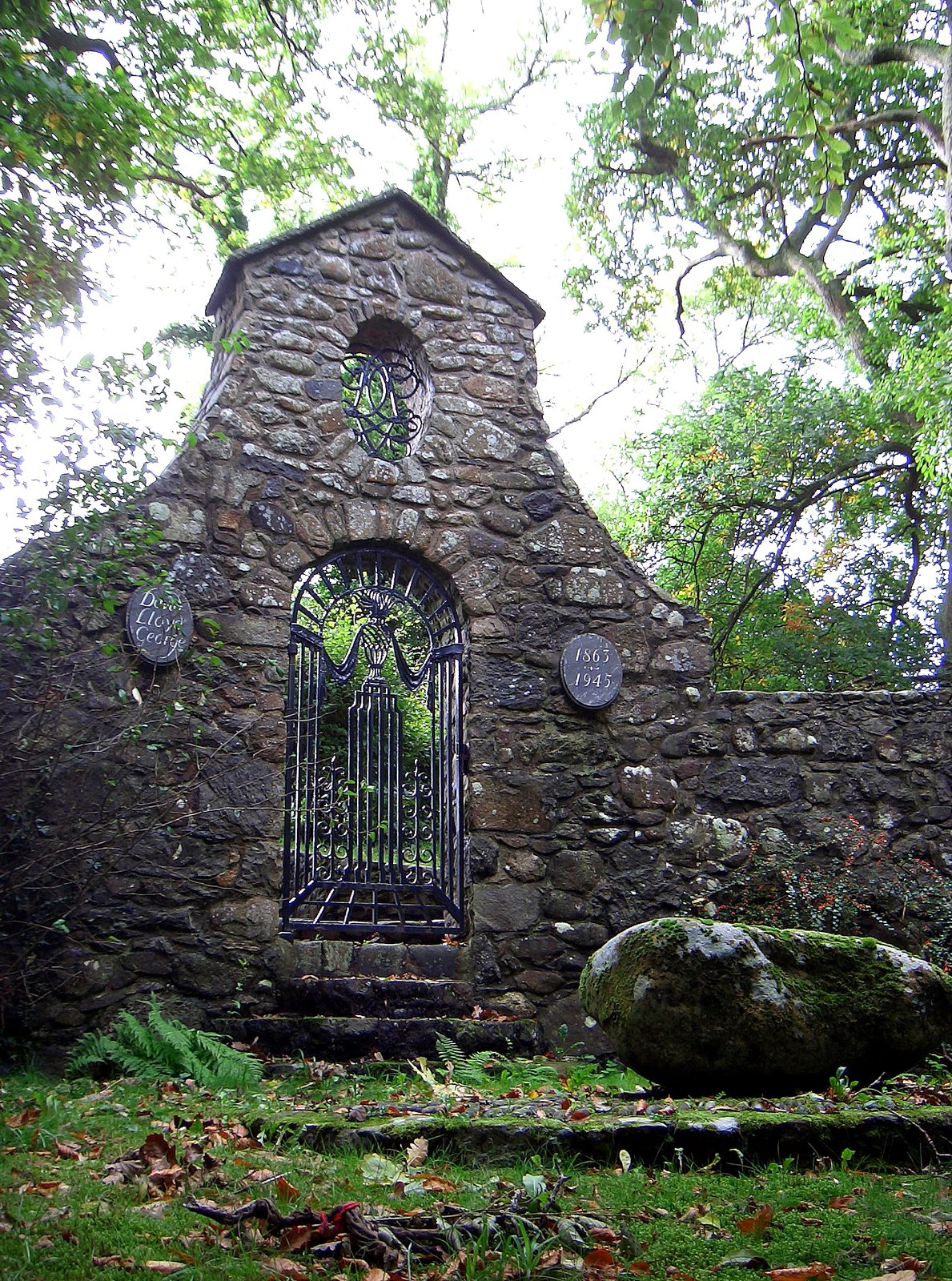
- "a hero's burying-place"

- Location within Gwynedd
- 52.9229°N 4.269°W
- Type: Grave
- Location: Llanystumdwy, Gwynedd

History
- Built: 1946

Site notes
- Area: North Wales
- Architect: Clough Williams-Ellis
- Architectural style: Vernacular

Listed Building – Grade II*
- Official name: Grave of David Lloyd George
- Designated: 31 March 1999
- Reference no.: 21601

The Grave of David Lloyd George, stands on a bank of the Afon Dwyfor in the village of Llanystumdwy, Gwynedd, Wales. It commemorates Lloyd George who grew up in the village, was Prime Minister of the United Kingdom between 1916 and 1922, and died at Llanystumdwy in 1945. The grave and its setting were designed by Clough Williams-Ellis, the architect of Portmerion and a lifelong friend of Lloyd George. The grave comprises a boulder set in an oval enclosure, the walls of which bear two slate plaques recording Lloyd George's name and the years of his birth and death. It is a Grade II* listed structure.

== History ==
David Lloyd George was born in Chorlton-on-Medlock, Manchester on 17 January 1863. Within months of his birth, his father, William George, moved the family to Pembrokeshire. His father's death the next year saw the family move again, to his mother's home village of Llanystumdwy, in what was then the county of Caernarfonshire (now Gwynedd), where they lived with Lloyd George's uncle, Robert Lloyd. Lloyd George qualified as a solicitor in 1884 and in 1890 was elected to Parliament as the Liberal M.P. for Carnarvon Boroughs. Originally on the Radical wing of the Liberal Party, in 1916 Lloyd George became Prime Minister in a coalition with the Conservatives. Although successful in his leadership of the country in World War I, Lloyd George was ejected from office in 1922, and never returned to power. He died of cancer aged 82 on 26 March 1945 and was buried at Llanystumdwy.

Lloyd George had long wanted to be buried beside the Dwyfor, telling his wife Margaret "I don't want to be buried anywhere else". In 1922, shortly after the murder of Michael Collins, which had greatly depressed him, he took Thomas Jones, the Deputy Secretary to the Cabinet, to Llanystumdwy and, on the banks of the Dwyfor told him "Bury me here. Don't put me in a cemetery. You'll have trouble with the relatives, and there would be controversy if the Abbey were suggested". He asked that John Morris-Jones write the epitaph and suggested the wording "Magwyd yn y pentref. Prif Weinidog Prydain yn y Rhyfel Mawr" (Bred in the village. Prime Minister of Britain in the Great War).

Clough Williams-Ellis, a long-term friend of Lloyd George, had been employed by Lloyd George's second wife, Frances Stevenson, to renovate their last home, Tŷ Newydd. (Note: Frances Stevenson had met Lloyd George in 1911, became his secretary and mistress in 1913, and finally married him in 1943, after the death of his first wife Margaret in 1941. Stevenson faced unremitting hostility from Lloyd George's daughter Megan; in 1946, when the enclosure around the grave was completed, Stevenson sent her a key to the entrance gate. The gesture was not acknowledged.) After Lloyd George's death, Stevenson, then Dowager Countess Lloyd-George of Dwyfor, commissioned Williams-Ellis to design his gravesite. Work was undertaken quickly, despite post-war restrictions on construction, and was completed in March 1946.

== Architecture and description ==
Bedd David Lloyd George (Iarll Dwyfor),
Y maen garw, a maen ei goron, – yw bedd
Gŵr i'w bobl fu'n wron;
Dyfrliw hardd yw Dwyfor lon,
Anwesa'r bedd yn gyson.
The Grave of David Lloyd George (Earl Dwyfor),
The rough stone, and the stone of his crown – is the grave
Of a man who was a hero to his people;
Merry Dwyfor is a beautiful watercolour,
That continuously embraces the grave.

— Englyn by W. R. P. George, Lloyd George's nephew and Archdruid of Wales

The centrepiece of the design is a large boulder from the Afon Dwyfor, on which Lloyd George used to sit, and under which he is buried. It rests on a plinth decorated with pebbles from the beach at Criccieth. The boulder stands within an oval enclosure, surrounded by a wall constructed of local stone rubble. Entry is through a decorative gate of wrought iron set into an arch; above the gate, carved onto a plaque of Welsh slate, is an englyn (Note: An englyn is a traditional form of short Welsh poem, intended to give "concise, intense, often pithy, expressions of an idea or an emotion".) [see box] by Lloyd George's nephew, W. R. P. George, (Note: W. R. P. George, a solicitor like his father and uncle, was also a noted Welsh-language poet and the Archdruid of Wales 1990–1993.) the lettering by Jonah Jones, (Note: Jonah Jones, who learnt his craft in the workshop of Eric Gill, also sculpted the memorial stone to Lloyd George in Westminster Abbey, again to a design by Clough Williams-Ellis.) and a Oeil-de-boeuf opening with the initials DLG, again sculpted in wrought iron. The architectural historian Andrew Saint considers the style of the arch more "Dutch-Afrikaans" than Welsh vernacular but notes the use of local building materials. (Note: Saint considers that the plaque with englyn, a later addition, "mars the austerity of rubble and ironwork".) On both internal sides of the gate wall are two further plaques carved with the name, David Lloyd George, and the years of his birth and death. From the gate, the walls, 1m high, curve round to the river, while the encircling path descends 14 steps ending at the river bank, at eye level with the boulder. Haslam, Orbach and Voelcker draw comparison with the "watery aesthetic of the Villa d'Este". A Grade II* listed structure, the authors of the Gwynedd Pevsner, call the site "a hero's burying-place and a consummate work of landscape design". The Cadw listing describes it as a "subtle and expressively designed memorial by a leading twentieth-century Welsh architect for one of the most important Prime Ministers of Britain".

== See also ==
- List of burial places of prime ministers of the United Kingdom

== Sources ==
- Aslet, Clive (2005). Landmarks of Britain. London, UK: Hodder & Stoughton. ISBN 978-0-340-73510-7.
- Carey Evans, Olwen; Garner, Mary (1985). Lloyd George Was My Father. Llandysul: Gomer Press. ISBN 978-0-863-83112-6. OCLC 1106804552.
- George, William (1958). My Brother and I. London, UK: Eyre & Spottiswoode. OCLC 4923426.
- Gilbert, Bentley Brinkerhoff (1987). David Lloyd George: A Political Life: The Architect of Change 1863–1912. London: Batsford. ISBN 978-0-713-45558-8. OCLC 929287024.
- Grigg, John (2003). Lloyd George: War Leader 1916-1918. London: Penguin Books. ISBN 978-0-140-28427-0. OCLC 464459719.
- Hague, Ffion (2009). The Pain and the Privilege: The Women Who Loved Lloyd George. London, UK: Harper Perennial. ISBN 978-0-007-21950-6. OCLC 751415721.
- Haslam, Richard; Orbach, Julian; Voelcker, Adam (2009). Gwynedd. The Buildings of Wales. New Haven, US and London: Yale University Press. ISBN 978-0-300-14169-6. OCLC 1023292902.
- Jenkins, Simon (2008). Wales: Churches, Houses, Castles. London: Penguin Books. ISBN 978-0-713-99893-1.
- Jones, Thomas (1969). Keith Middlemas (ed.). Whitehall Diary: Volume I. London: Oxford University Press. ISBN 0192111930. OCLC 823680810.
- Toye, Richard (2007). Lloyd George & Churchill: Rivals for Greatness. London: Macmillan Publishers. ISBN 978-1-405-04896-5. OCLC 1169990594.
