= Dwyfan and Dwyfach =

Dwyfan and Dwyfach, sometimes also called Dwyvan and Dwyvach, in Welsh mythology feature in a flood legend from the Welsh Triads. The Afanc, a monster that lived in Llyn Llion (which could be Llyn Tegid) caused a huge flood. Dwyfan and Dwyfach were the sole human survivors, escaping in a mastless boat. They constructed an ark-like vessel named Nefyd Naf Neifion, which was to carry a pair of each species. Thus Prydain (Britain) was re-populated by this pair. Comparisons have been made with Noah and Deucalion. There have been some differences in the stories though. Obviously, a big difference between the stories is that for Noah, it was just him. For this story however, it was two people that worked together to bring back the population. "For the Bible it was the wrath of God. In the Welsh flood story, it was caused by a terrible monster." The figure Dwyfach is identified with the small Dwyfach (Welsh for 'little Dwy') river of Gwynedd entering Cardigan Bay near Porthmadog, whilst Dwyfan is identified with the river it enters, the Dwyfawr or Dwyfor.

A lake monster from Welsh mythology, the afanc can also be traced through references in British and Celtic folklore. Sometimes described as taking the form of a crocodile, giant beaver or dwarf, it is also said to be a demonic creature. The afanc was said to attack and devour anyone who entered its waters. The afanc has been variously known as the addanc, adanc, addane, avanc, abhac and abac. Several sites besides Llyn Llion lay claim to its domain, among them are Llyn Barfog and Llyn-yr-Afanc (the Afanc Pool), a lake in Betws-y-Coed.

Various versions of the tale are known to have existed. Iolo Morganwg, who revived Welsh bardic traditions during the 18th and 19th centuries, popularised a version of the myth that had Hu Gadarn's two long-horned oxen drag the afanc from the lake, enabling it to be killed. An earlier variation on this had the oxen cast the afanc into Llyn Ffynnon Las (lake of the blue fountain), where it was unable to breach its rocky banks to escape.

In one telling the wild thrashings of the afanc caused flooding which drowned all the people of Britain, save two, Dwyfan and Dwyfach. Another has a maiden who tamed the afanc by letting it sleep in her lap, which allowed her fellow villagers to capture it. When the afanc awoke its struggles crushed the maiden.

Later legends had King Arthur or Peredur slaying the monster. Near Llyn Barfog is a rock with a hoof print carved into it, along with the words Carn March Arthur (stone of Arthur's horse), supposedly made when his steed, Llamrai, dragged the afanc from the deep.
