= Gwilym Prichard =

Welsh landscape painter (1931–2015)

- Born: Gwilym Arifor Prichard; 4 March 1931; Llanystumdwy, Wales
- Died: 7 June 2015 (aged 84); Tenby, Pembrokeshire
- Education: Birmingham College of Art
- Known for: Landscape
- Elected: Royal Cambrian Academy

Gwilym Arifor Prichard (né Pritchard; 4 March 1931 – 7 June 2015) was a Welsh landscape painter.

== Early life ==
Born in the village of Llanystumdwy, near Criccieth, Gwynedd, he studied at Bangor Normal College (1951-3) before moving on to Birmingham College of Art, before becoming a teacher in Anglesey. He married fellow artist Claudia Williams in 1953, and altered the spelling of his surname when he discovered that there was another painter of the same name. Their son, Ceri Pritchard, is a painter.

== Style ==
Noted for his "dramatic and colourful" depictions of "dense, craggy, often formidable landscapes" with "a three-dimensional quality", Prichard's paintings "managed to display his joy in the richness and beauty of his native land". He started to become successful during the 1960s, and in 1970 he was elected to the Royal Cambrian Academy.

== Professional life ==
After leaving paid employment in the early 1970s, he became a full-time painter. In the early 1980s the couple began travelling through Europe, living for periods in Skiathos, Greece and Rochefort-en-Terre, Brittany, before settling in Pembrokeshire in 1999. Prichard was awarded the silver medal by the Société Académique des Arts-Sciences-Lettres de Paris in 1995, and was an Honorary Fellow of the University of Wales. In later years he was regarded as the senior living Welsh landscape painter. A major exhibition of his work was held in Cardiff in 2013, and a monograph detailing his work, A Lifetime's Gazing, was published the same year.

== Death ==
Prichard died at his home in Tenby June 7, 2015.
