= Prenteg =

Coordinates: 52.953°N 4.107°W

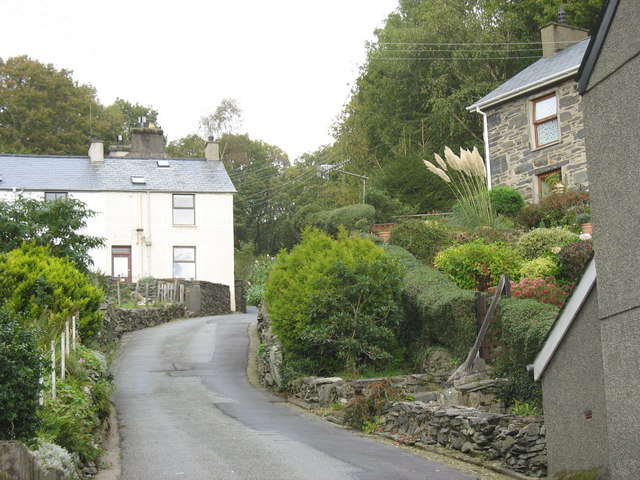
- The older part of Prenteg

- Location within Gwynedd
- OS grid reference: SH584416
- Community: Dolbenmaen
- Principal area: Gwynedd
- Country: Wales
- Sovereign state: United Kingdom
- Post town: PORTHMADOG
- Postcode district: LL49
- Dialling code: 01766
- Police: North Wales
- Fire: North Wales
- Ambulance: Welsh
- UK Parliament: Dwyfor Meirionnydd
- Senedd Cymru – Welsh Parliament: Dwyfor Meirionnydd

Prenteg is a hamlet that lies 3 miles (4.8 km) from Porthmadog, Wales, between Tremadog and Beddgelert.

== See also ==
- The July 2010 wind storms in Global storm activity of 2010.
