= Garndolbenmaen =

Coordinates: 52.973°N 4.238°W

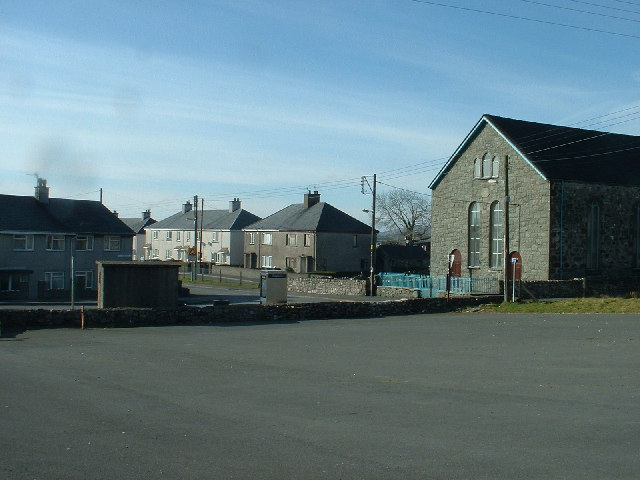
- Garndolbenmaen village centre

- Location within Gwynedd
- Population: 365 (2011)
- OS grid reference: SH497441
- Community: Dolbenmaen
- Principal area: Gwynedd
- Country: Wales
- Sovereign state: United Kingdom
- Post town: GARNDOLBENMAEN
- Postcode district: LL51
- Dialling code: 01766
- Police: North Wales
- Fire: North Wales
- Ambulance: Welsh
- UK Parliament: Dwyfor Meirionnydd
- Senedd Cymru – Welsh Parliament: Gwynedd Maldwyn

Garndolbenmaen (nicknamed Garn) is a village in the county of Gwynedd, Wales. It lies near the A487, approximately 6 miles (10 km) north west of Porthmadog, in the community of Dolbenmaen, which has a population of 1,300. The closest villages are Dolbenmaen and Bryncir. The Papur Bro, the local Welsh language paper, is called Y Ffynnon (The Source/Spring). The village itself has a population of around 300.

In 1856-7 Evan Jones of Garndolbenmaen built the Ynys-y-Pandy Mill on the nearby Gorseddau Junction and Portmadoc Railway.

Approximately 50 pupils attend Ysgol Gynradd Garndolbenmaen, many pupils travel from nearby villages including Pant Glas, Bryncir, Cwm Pennant and Golan. The number of pupils attending the school has remained consistent over the past 20 years.

Many of the old cottages in Garndolbenmaen have been turned into holiday homes.

Blaen y Cae recording studios are located in the village, where Pep Le Pew's album, Un tro yn y Gorllewin and the last album by Gwyneth Glyn, Wyneb Dros Dro, were recorded.

The magazine Narrow Gauge and Industrial Railway Modelling Review is published in Garndolbenmaen

== Climate ==
Garndolbenmaen has an oceanic climate (Köppen: Cfb).

Climate data for Cwmystradllyn 205m amsl (1991-2020)
Month	Jan	Feb	Mar	Apr	May	Jun	Jul	Aug	Sep	Oct	Nov	Dec	Year
Record high °C (°F)	11.0 (51.8)	13.0 (55.4)	15.0 (59.0)	20.0 (68.0)	26.0 (78.8)	29.5 (85.1)	29.5 (85.1)	28.0 (82.4)	22.0 (71.6)	20.5 (68.9)	16.0 (60.8)	14.0 (57.2)	29.5 (85.1)
Mean daily maximum °C (°F)	7.0 (44.6)	7.6 (45.7)	9.3 (48.7)	11.9 (53.4)	14.9 (58.8)	17.0 (62.6)	18.2 (64.8)	18.8 (65.8)	16.3 (61.3)	13.4 (56.1)	10.2 (50.4)	7.9 (46.2)	12.7 (54.9)
Daily mean °C (°F)	4.8 (40.6)	4.9 (40.8)	6.2 (43.2)	8.2 (46.8)	11.3 (52.3)	13.5 (56.3)	15.2 (59.4)	15.3 (59.5)	12.9 (55.2)	10.4 (50.7)	7.4 (45.3)	5.3 (41.5)	9.6 (49.3)
Mean daily minimum °C (°F)	2.5 (36.5)	2.2 (36.0)	3.1 (37.6)	4.5 (40.1)	7.6 (45.7)	10.0 (50.0)	12.2 (54.0)	11.8 (53.2)	9.5 (49.1)	7.4 (45.3)	4.7 (40.5)	2.6 (36.7)	6.5 (43.7)
Record low °C (°F)	−6.0 (21.2)	−7.0 (19.4)	−5.0 (23.0)	−4.5 (23.9)	−1.0 (30.2)	3.0 (37.4)	6.0 (42.8)	5.0 (41.0)	2.0 (35.6)	2.0 (35.6)	−2.0 (28.4)	−7.5 (18.5)	−7.5 (18.5)
Average precipitation mm (inches)	181.3 (7.14)	153.8 (6.06)	145.1 (5.71)	116.4 (4.58)	113.4 (4.46)	135.9 (5.35)	160.2 (6.31)	165.2 (6.50)	173.2 (6.82)	206.8 (8.14)	219.1 (8.63)	218.0 (8.58)	1,988.4 (78.28)
Average precipitation days (≥ 1.0 mm)	18.7	16.6	15.8	14.6	13.1	13.3	15.2	16.5	15.6	18.2	20.6	20.3	198.6
Mean monthly sunshine hours	42.5	63.3	106.9	158.9	183.5	166.7	163.2	143.7	106.2	78.5	48.8	36.6	1,298.7
Source 1: Met Office
Source 2: Starlings Roost Weather
