= Pen Llystyn =

Roman fort in Gwynedd, Wales

Coordinates: 52.9837°N 4.2697°W

Pen Llystyn, sometimes referred to as Pen Llys Tyn, was a Roman fort located to the north of Bryncir, between Porthmadog and Caernarfon in Gwynedd, north Wales. The fort itself stands on the east bank of the Afon Dwyfach.

== Fort ==
The fort that stood on the site was a wooden construction, covering an area approximately 1.6 hectares. General belief is that it was built around the year 80 AD as a garrison consisting of soldiers and centurions. The purpose of the fort was to serve during the Roman attempt to conquer North Wales. It is believed that the site was chosen to allow for the policing of the Ganganorum Promontorium (Llŷn Peninsula). It is situated along the Roman military road between the forts of Segontium (Caernarfon) and Tomen y Mur. It is placed where the road makes a marked change of alignment.

The plan of the fort suggests that it housed around 960 foot-soldiers. This is believed because of numerous barrack blocks each with ten double rooms and a centurial block at the end nearest the defences. Today the site is almost completely destroyed due to gravel-working. Work in the 1950s and 1960s allowed for the creation of this extremely rare plan of the fort. This makes the site of extreme importance as it is one of very few to have a detailed plan of the fort itself.

== Findings ==
It is noted that in the garden of the nearby Llystyn Gwyn farm, to the north of the site, a stone was found from the 6th century with Latin and Ogham inscriptions. In Latin the inscription reads ICORI(X) FILIUS / POTENT / INI (Icorix, son of Potentinus). Bilingual inscriptions are common in south west Wales, however this is the only one to have been found in north west Wales, making the piece extremely rare in this context.
