= Narrow Gauge and Industrial Railway Modelling Review =

- Issue 109
- Discipline: Rail transport modelling
- Language: English

Publication details
- History: 1989 to present
- Publisher: Guideline Publications

Standard abbreviations
- ISO 4: Narrow Gauge Ind. Railw. Model. Rev.

Indexing
- ISSN: 0958-0808

Links
- Journal homepage

Narrow Gauge and Industrial Railway Modelling Review is a quarterly British magazine. Roy C Link started the magazine back in 1989 with the concept of setting subject material - prototypes and models - in the best possible light. In 2012 (from issue 89) it transferred to Greystar Publications with Roy remaining the production editor. Roy took back editing and production from issue 103 in 2015 with the death of the Greystar proprietor/editor Bob Barlow. In 2017 John and Marion Clutterbuck formally took over the Review production under the Narrow Gauge and Industrial banner with Roy remaining as editor. In November 2020 Roy died and John Clutterbuck took over as editor from issue 125. In March 2025 the business was taken over by Guideline Publications.

The magazine specialises in narrow gauge and industrial railways from both a prototype and modeling perspective, concentrating on the United Kingdom, but also covering Europe and overseas subjects.
