= Lloyd George Museum =

- Amgueddfa
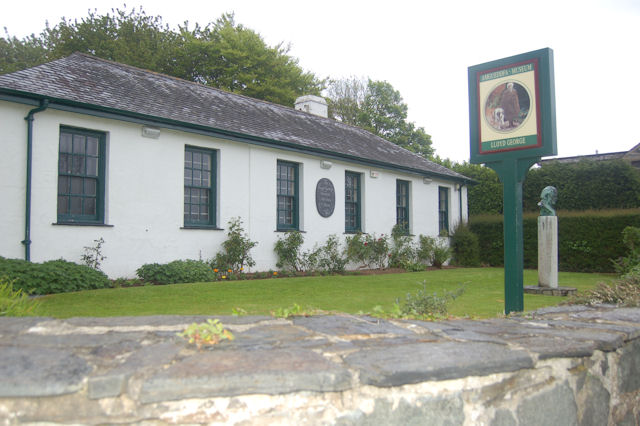

- Location within Gwynedd
- Location: Llanystumdwy, Gwynedd, Wales
- Coordinates: 52.9218°N 4.2696°W
- Type: Biographical museum
- Owner: Gwynedd Council
- Website: Lloyd George Museum

The Lloyd George Museum is dedicated to the life and times of David Lloyd George, the Welshman who was Prime Minister of the United Kingdom from 1916 to 1922. It is located in Lloyd George's home village of Llanystumdwy, Wales, where he is buried, and is run by Gwynedd Council. It is normally open during the summer months and by appointment during the rest of the year.

The Lloyd George Museum Trust was founded in 1948, three years after the death of Lloyd George, and its secretary, Ann Parry, was the first curator of the museum. The main exhibition was opened in 1960, in the presence of Countess Lloyd-George of Dwyfor, Lloyd George's widow. It was housed in a new building designed by Clough Williams-Ellis, which was extended, refurbished and reopened in 1990. The opening ceremony was conducted by Lord Callaghan.

The museum also includes Highgate, the boyhood home of Lloyd George, which has been furnished and decorated to appear as it was in the late 19th century. The family was almost destitute following the death of Lloyd George's father, and was able to live there only through the generosity of his mother's brother Richard Lloyd (1834–1917), a shoemaker and clergyman. Richard's mother, the children's grandmother, also lived with them there.

Among the artefacts at the museum is Lloyd George's draft copy of the Conditions of Peace at Versailles. Other exhibits include deeds of freedom, documents and photographs. "Lloyd George's Crown" is a coin representing the first old age pension to be paid in Wales.

== See also ==
- Lloyd George Society
