= Conwy Falls =

Waterfall in north Wales

- Rhaeadr y Graig Lwyd (Welsh)
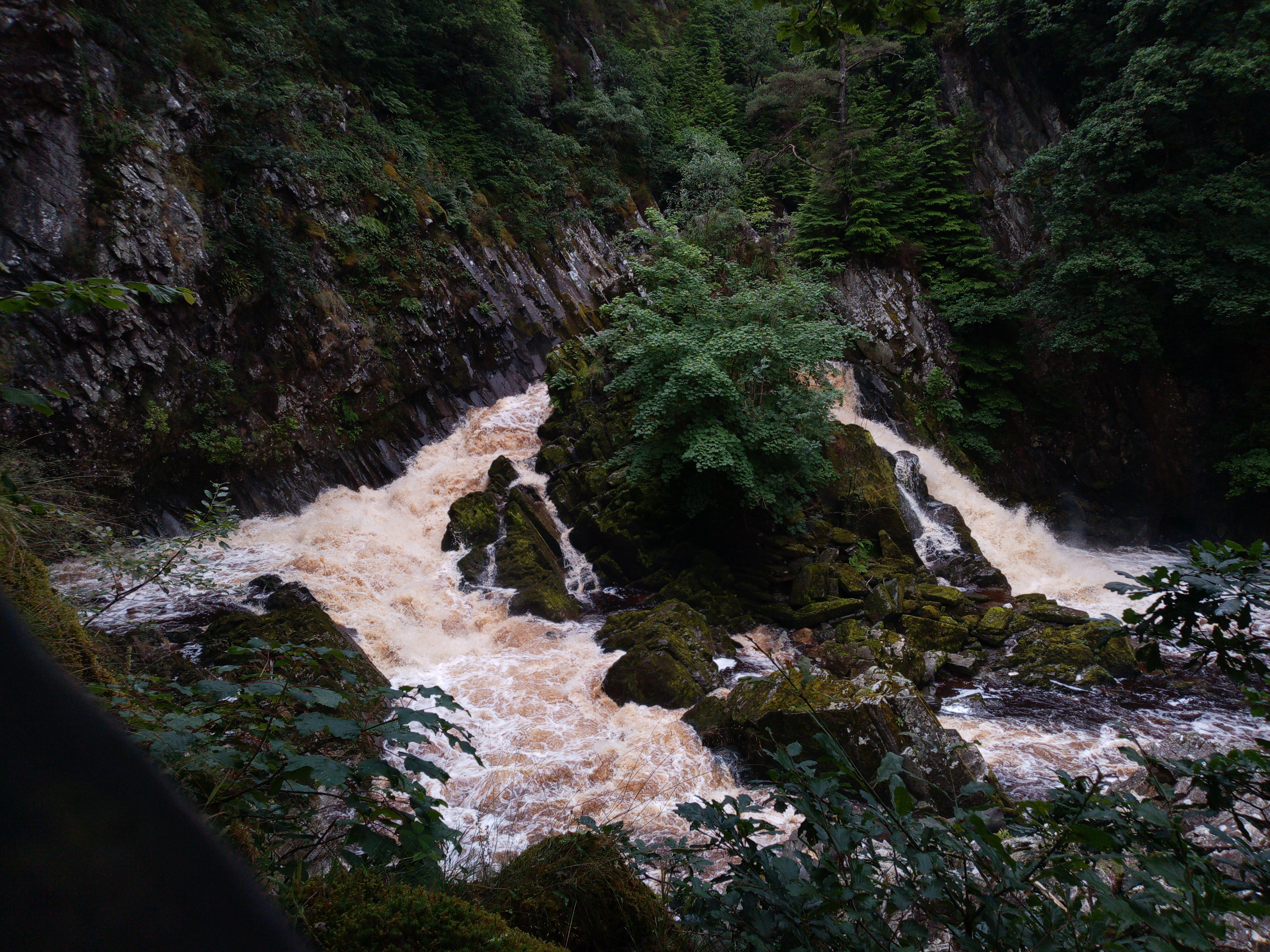
- Conwy Falls as seen from the viewpoint near the bottom of the falls in Wales.
- Interactive map of Conwy Falls
- Location: Conwy County Borough, Wales, United Kingdom
- Coordinates: 53°03′55″N 3°46′45″W
- Total height: 50 feet (15 m)

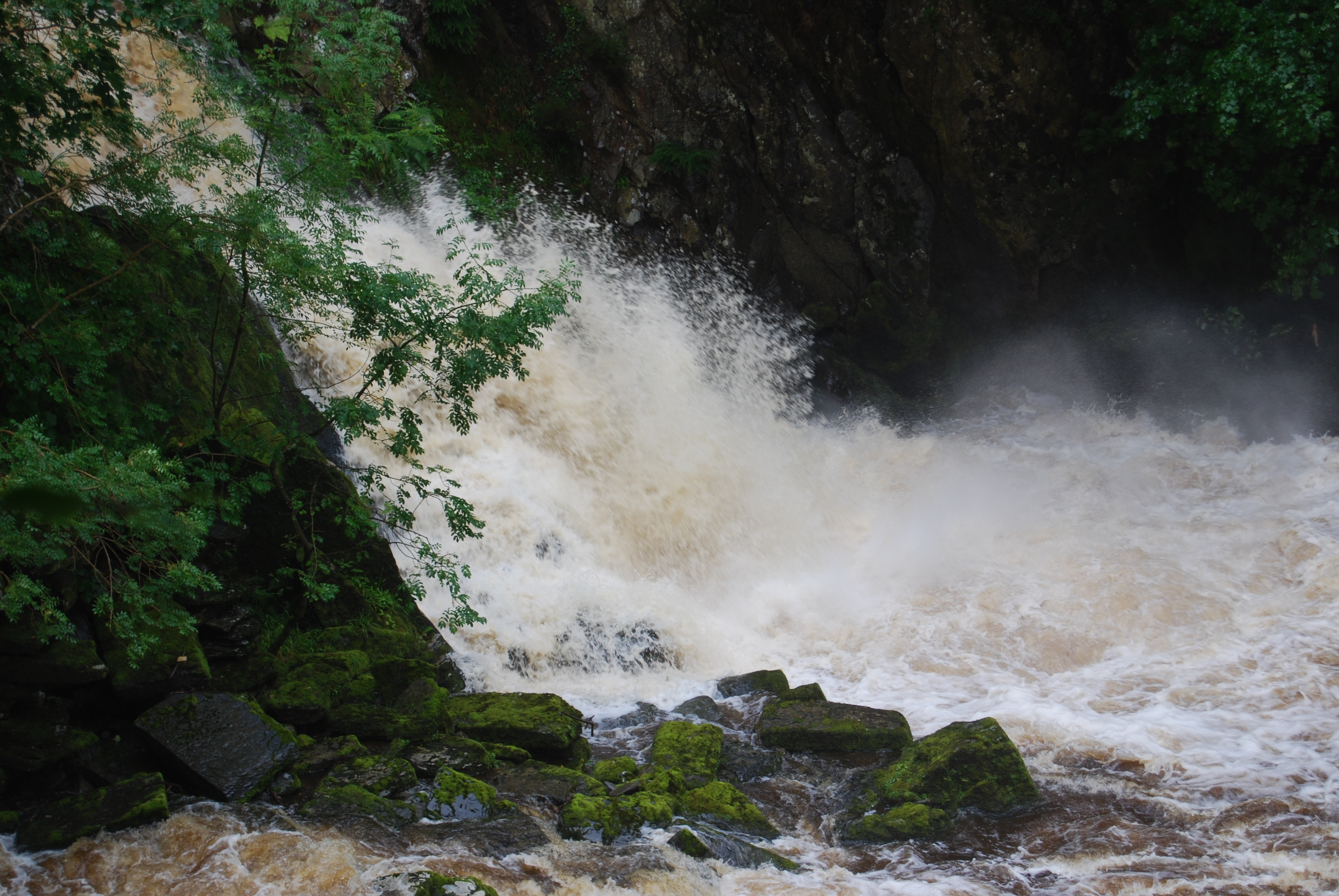
Conwy Falls after heavy rain

Conwy Falls (Welsh: Rhaeadr y Graig Lwyd) is a waterfall on the River Conwy at Bro Garmon in Conwy County Borough in Wales. The falls and surrounding area are a Site of Special Scientific Interest. The nearby cafe, adjacent to the A5, is an interesting example of the work of the Welsh architect Clough Williams-Ellis, of Portmeirion fame.

== The falls, woodland and wildlife ==
The falls are located in the last gorge section of the River Conwy at a point where it plunges 50 feet (15 m) into a deep pool. The falls are accessible via natural paths through the preserved woodland of the SSSI. Polecats and other wild animals, including 32 species of bird, inhabit the surrounding woodlands, which extend to approximately 9.5 acres (38,000 m^{2}).

== Salmon ladder ==
The River Conwy is a salmon river, and there are two salmon ladders at the falls. One is a disused Victorian wooden ladder that was destroyed by a storm soon after being built, and incorporating steps hewn into the rock. The second is a modern ladder, built in 1993 at a cost of nearly £1m, which can detect and count every fish that enters. This ladder—not visible to the public—consists of some 30 pools set in a zig-zag pattern within a piped tunnel.

There is a water gauging station at the Falls, measuring the flow into the fish pass. When low levels are detected, the flow is diverted over the falls, rather than through the pass, to ensure that flora in the gorge is protected.

== The cafe building ==
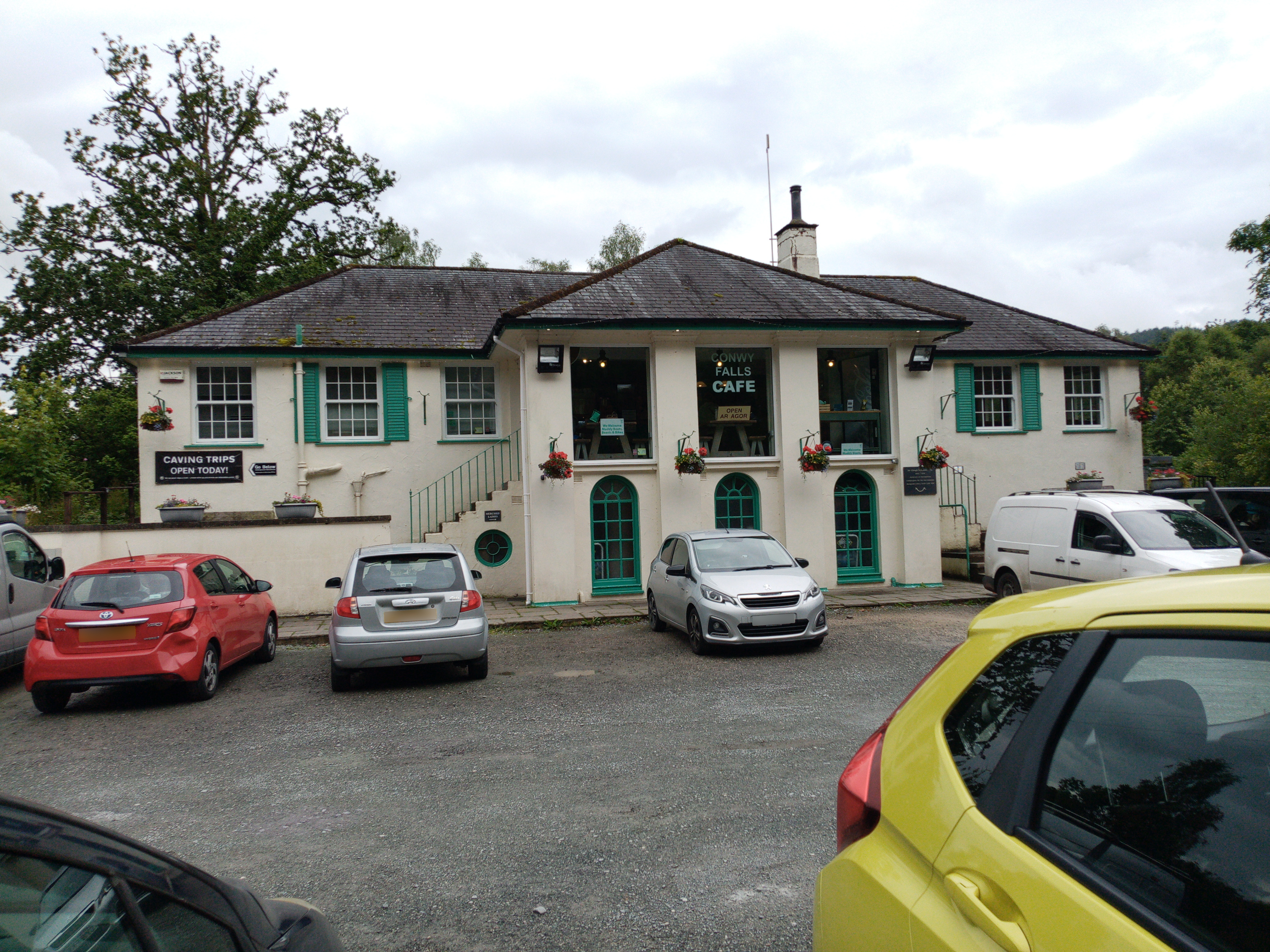
The front of the cafe building near Conwy Falls in Wales named Conwy Falls Cafe.

The first cafe at the falls was simply a wooden hut. In 1938 the Welsh architect Clough Williams-Ellis was consulted with regard to the design of a new building, the original design being for a building perched on the rocks above the falls, but this was never built. The current building dates from the 1950s and, although rather different from Williams-Ellis' design (drawings of which are displayed in the cafe's main room), is nevertheless an excellent example of his style, the cafe being "provided with a pediment in the Georgian style and an open loggia on the upper level."

== Hydro-electric scheme ==
In 2016 a planning application was submitted for the construction of a 5MW hydro-electricity generating plant at Conwy Falls and the Fairy Glen. An earlier application had been rejected, and the new proposal involved construction of a weir above Conwy Falls, and 1 km of tunnels and buried pipelines. It elicited strong objections from groups concerned with biodiversity, and the application was again rejected.

== See also ==
- List of waterfalls
- List of waterfalls in Wales
