= Claudia Williams (artist) =

Welsh artist (1933–2024)

- Born: August 19, 1933; Purley, England
- Died: 17 June 2024 (aged 90)
- Education: Chelsea School of Art
- Known for: Painting
- Spouse: Gwilym Prichard

Claudia Jane Herington Williams (19 August 1933 – 17 June 2024) was a Welsh artist known for her paintings, often large colourful portraits. Although born in England, Williams spent the majority of her career painting in Wales.

== Biography ==
Williams was born in Purley, Surrey on 19 August 1933. She was educated at the Eothen School in Caterham before entering the Chelsea School of Art in 1950. That year she was the winner of the young persons art prize at the National Eisteddford of Wales held at Caerphilly. Williams graduated from Chelsea in 1953 and over the next decade, alongside teaching part-time in schools and for the Workers' Educational Association, became a regular participant both in group exhibitions organised by the Arts Council of Wales and at the annual Eisteddford art shows. Her work was included in the Contemporary Welsh Painting and Sculpture exhibition held at the National Museum of Wales in Cardiff during 1957.

Williams married the artist Gwilym Prichard and they held a number of joint exhibitions, notably as part of the Bangor Arts Festival. In the early 1980s the couple began travelling through Europe, living for periods on Skiathos in Greece and, for fifteen years, near Rochefort-en-Terre in Brittany, before returning to Wales in 1999. Williams participated in several group shows in Europe, winning first prize at the Salon de Vannes in 1989, exhibiting at the Salon des Beaux Arts in Paris in 1993 and at the Salon de Nantes Biennale in both 1987 and 1989. Solo shows of her paintings were held at the Galerie Romanet in Paris in 1989 and at the Philip Mouwes Gallery in Amsterdam in 1994.

Williams was elected a member of the Royal Cambrian Academy in 1979 and became an Honorary Fellow of Bangor University in 2002. The Academy of Arts, Sciences and Letters in Paris awarded her their Silver Medal in 1995. The National Library of Wales at Aberystwyth held a major retrospective of her work in 2000 and an exhibition of more recent works in 2010 while the Martin Tinney Gallery in Cardiff held an exhibition of new material in 2016. In 2014 the National Library of Wales published a book of some twenty paintings, mostly pastels, by Williams that were inspired by the displacement of local villages to create the Llyn Celyn reservoir. Works by Williams are held in the art collections of Bangor University, Aberystwyth University, Southampton Art Gallery and Newport Museum and Art Gallery.

Williams died on 17 June 2024, at the age of 90.
