= Gorseddau Junction and Portmadoc Railway =

Welsh tramway

Overview
- Headquarters: Porthmadog
- Locale: Wales
- Dates of operation: 1875–1887

Technical
- Track gauge: 2 ft (610 mm)

Other

UNESCO World Heritage Site
- Part of: The Slate Landscape of Northwest Wales
- Criteria: Cultural: ii, iv
- Reference: 1633-004
- Inscription: 2021 (44th Session)

The Gorseddau Junction and Portmadoc Railway (GJ&PR) was a Welsh tramway.

The GJ&PR was a 2 ft (610 mm) narrow-gauge railway connecting the slate quarries of Cwm Pennant with the wharves at Porthmadog harbour. It was built in 1872, partly as a conversion of the earlier 3 ft (914 mm) gauge Gorseddau Tramway, which in itself had incorporated the even earlier 3 ft (914 mm) gauge Tremadoc Tramway. It opened to mineral and goods traffic in 1875.

== Route and operation ==
The main line followed the route of the original Gorseddau Tramway from Porthmadog through Tremadoc, Penmorfa and Ynys-y-Pandy to Gorseddau quarry. On conversion, the line from Porthmadog to Braich-y-bib, just north of Ynys-y-Pandy, was regauged to 2 ft (610 mm). A new extension was added from Braich-y-bib. This led west along the Cwm Pennant before heading north to Cwm Trwsgl where inclines served the Prince of Wales and Dol-ifan-Gethin slate quarries and the Cwm Dywfor copper and lead mine. This branch added an additional 5 miles to the length of the railway, for a total length of 13 miles. At Porthmadog the last few hundred yards of the original Gorseddau route were abandoned and traffic was worked to the wharves over the Croesor Tramway. At around the same time the line from Braich-y-bib to Gorseddau quarry had been abandoned. The Prince of Wales quarry supplied most of the traffic for the railway during its existence.

Unlike its predecessor the GJ&PR had a single steam locomotive, a vertical boilered De Winton named Pert, although it continued to use horses as motive power for most of its existence. The locomotive is believed to have been disused after 1878, and to have been sold in 1896 to Glodd-fa'r-Glai Quarry which was connected to the Nantlle Railway.

== Abandonment ==
By 1887, the railway had largely fallen into disuse as the mines and quarries it served failed, and by 1890 single wagons were being hand-propelled to Porthmadog. The land the railway ran on was sold in 1897, by which time it had been dismantled. Between about 1903 and 1907, a short section of Gorseddau trackbed between the Cambrian Railways station in Porthmadog and the junction with the Croesor Tramway was again re-used to connect the Moel y Gest quarry tramway via the Croesor and the Festiniog to the wharves. Although the latter tramway closed in 1907 and was re-laid in 1919 as a standard-gauge siding of the Cambrian, this section survived until the early 1950s.

== Ynys-y-Pandy Mill ==
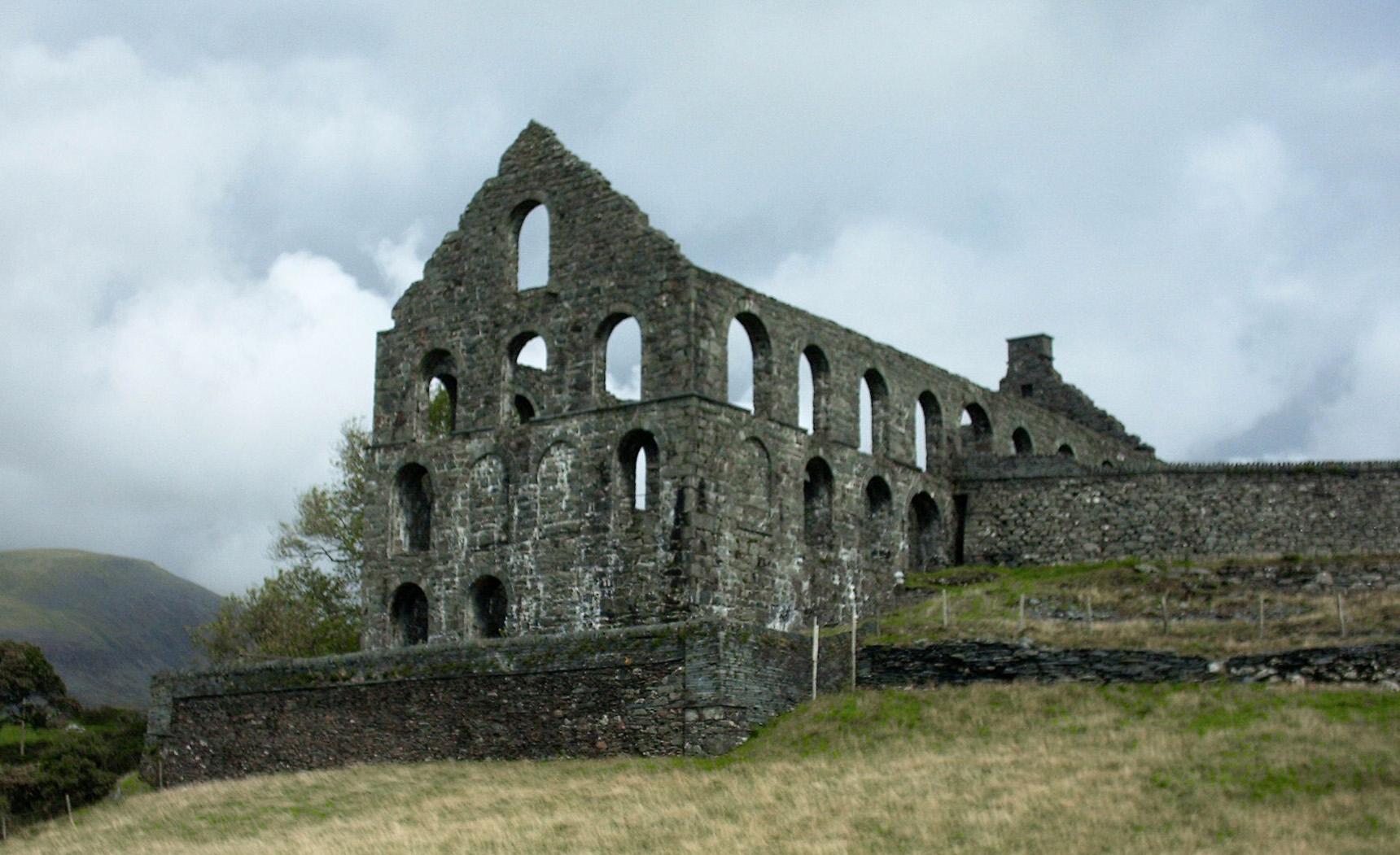
Ynys-y-Pandy slate mill

The railway served the Ynys-y-Pandy Mill (Welsh: Melin Ynys-y-Pandy) a three-storey structure which processed slate from the Gorseddau Quarry. The mill was built in 1856-7 by Evan Jones of Garndolbenmaen and is believed to have been designed by James Brunlees. A curved ramp brought two branches of the railway into the mill on two different levels, one to the upper floor, the other to the middle floor. The building incorporated a 26 feet (7.9 m) diameter internal overshot water wheel. The mill produced flag-stones, dairy equipment, troughs and urinals. The building was a venue for eisteddfodau until the roof was removed around 1906. The remains of the mill is Grade II* listed. The small waste tips at the site show that little slate was worked at the mill. In the 1980s the mill was bought by the Snowdonia National Park Authority and the stonework was repaired.

'Ynys y Pandy' is Welsh for 'Isle of Pandy' or 'Pandy Island'.
