= Gorseddau Tramway =

Defunct railway in North Wales

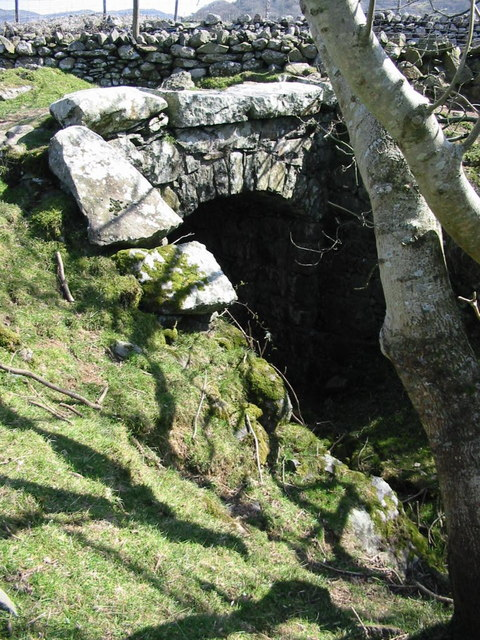
- Gorseddau tramway bridge

Overview
- Headquarters: Porthmadog
- Locale: Wales
- Dates of operation: 1857–1872
- Successor: Gorseddau Junction and Portmadoc Railway

Technical
- Track gauge: 3 ft (914 mm)

Other

UNESCO World Heritage Site
- Part of: The Slate Landscape of Northwest Wales
- Criteria: Cultural: ii, iv
- Reference: 1633-004
- Inscription: 2021 (44th Session)

The Gorseddau Tramway was a 3 ft (914 mm) narrow gauge railway built in Wales in 1856 to link the slate quarries around Gorseddau with the wharves at Porthmadog. It was an early forerunner of the Gorseddau Junction and Portmadoc Railway and subsequently the Welsh Highland Railway.

== Tremadoc Tramway ==
The Tremadoc tramway (sometimes known as the Llidiartyspytty Railway) was built by William Madocks sometime before 1842, and possibly as early as the 1830s. It connected the ironstone mine at Llidiart Yspytty to Porthmadog harbour. Little is known about the operation of the railway, though it is believed to have been horse worked with similar track and rolling stock to the nearby Nantlle Railway. The ironstone mine was not successful, so the tramway was extended to serve a nearby slate quarry, which was owned by the Bangor & Portmadoc Slate & Slab Co. Ltd.

In 1856, the Bangor & Portmadoc Slate & Slab company requested tenders to extend the line 2 1/4 miles (3.6 km) to the Gorseddau slate quarry (known at the time by its local Welsh name, Gorsedda), at Glan Bwll. The engineer was James Brunlees, who was based in Manchester. The extended railway, completed in 1857, was known as the Gorsedda Tramway.

== Route and operation ==
From the wharves at Porthmadog harbor the line curved through the town and ran alongside the Y Cyt canal to Tremadog. From there a reversing neck marked the beginning of the extension towards Gorseddau. The route headed west through the village of Penmorfa where it passed under the main road in a short tunnel. Along this stretch gradients reached a maximum of 1 in 23. At Henefail the line turned north past Ynys-y-Pandy and on to Gorseddau where a short incline lead into the quarry. The line ran a total distance of just over 8 miles and rose 900 feet in that distance. Down loads were worked by gravity.

The line was horse operated using wagons and a passenger carriage supplied by the Boston Lodge works of the Ffestiniog Railway.

== Takeover ==
In 1863, the Croesor Tramway was built, connecting the slate quarries of the Croesor valley with Porthmadog. This 2 ft (610 mm) narrow gauge tramway crossed the Gorseddau on the level on the edge of Porthmadog and served the same wharves.

In 1871, notice was given by the owners of the Gorseddau Tramway that they intended to replace the tramway with a new railway between Gorseddau and Porthmadog of 2 ft (610 mm) narrow gauge. This would allow common rolling stock to be used between the Croesor and Gorseddau tramways and the Ffestiniog railway, all of which delivered slate to Porthmadog harbour. An act of parliament was authorized on 25 July 1872 and the Gorseddau Junction and Portmadoc Railway was created, replacing the Gorseddau Tramway.
