= Afon Dwyfor =

River in Gwynedd, Wales

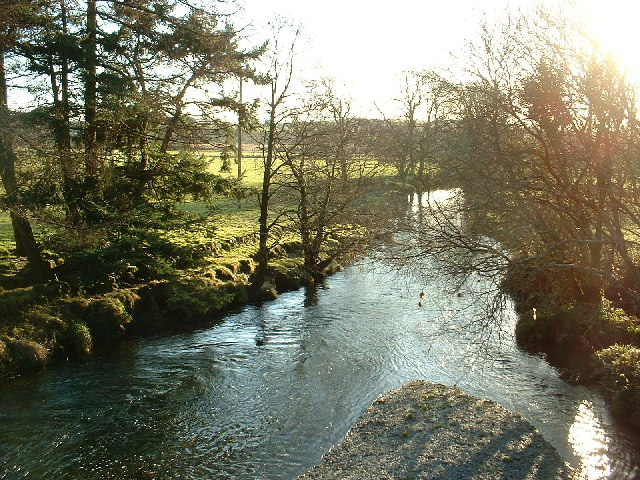
- The Afon Dwyfor as it leaves Cwm Pennant

Location
- Country: United Kingdom, Wales

Physical characteristics
- Source
  - location: Cwm Dwyfor, Eifionydd Hills
  - coordinates: 53°01′13″N 4°10′41″W
  - elevation: 460 ft (140 m)
- Mouth
  - location: Tremadog Bay, Cardigan Bay
  - coordinates: 52°54′38″N 4°15′38″W
  - elevation: 0 ft (0 m)
- Length: 12.5 mi (20.1 km)

The Afon Dwyfor is a river in Gwynedd, north-west Wales, in total the river is 12 1/2 miles (20.1 km) in length. It rises in Cwm Dwyfor at the head of Cwm Pennant, gathers to itself numerous streams which drain the surrounding mountains from Mynydd Graig Goch in the west to Moel Hebog in the east, then flows southwest towards Dolbenmaen and out of the Snowdonia National Park.

After a brief diversion west, it turns south, then southwest again, heading for the village of Llanystumdwy. Beyond Llanystumdwy it heads for the coast and Tremadog Bay. Its mouth has been diverted eastwards by almost one mile by a shingle spit resulting from longshore drift.

Its principal tributaries are the Afon Henwy which enters on its left bank above Dolbenmaen, and the Afon Dwyfach which joins it as a right-bank tributary to the west of Llanystumdwy. The Dwyfach itself rises in an area of flat ground to the west of the A487 road between Bryncir and Llanllyfni and flows in a generally southerly direction.

'Afon Dwyfor' signifies the 'big holy river' in Welsh, with 'for' being a corrupted form of 'fawr' (large), 'Dwyfawr' being a form recorded in 1838, whilst the 'Afon Dwyfach' is the 'little holy river'. The legend of Dwyfan and Dwyfach has been attached to the two rivers.

The river is bridged by numerous minor roads and paths but also by the A487, B4411 and A497 roads as well as the railway line between Criccieth and Pwllheli. At Dolbenmaen it is believed the Roman road to Segontium forded the river. A motte-and-bailey castle, once the residence of Llywelyn the Great, guarded the ford during the Middle Ages.

The grave of David Lloyd George, prime minister from 1916-1922, stands beside the Dwyfor in Llanystumdwy. A boulder marks the grave; there is no inscription; however a monument designed by the architect Sir Clough Williams-Ellis was subsequently erected around the grave, bearing an englyn (strict-metre stanza) engraved on slate in his memory composed by his nephew Dr W. R. P. George.
