= Llanystumdwy =

Village in Gwynedd, Wales

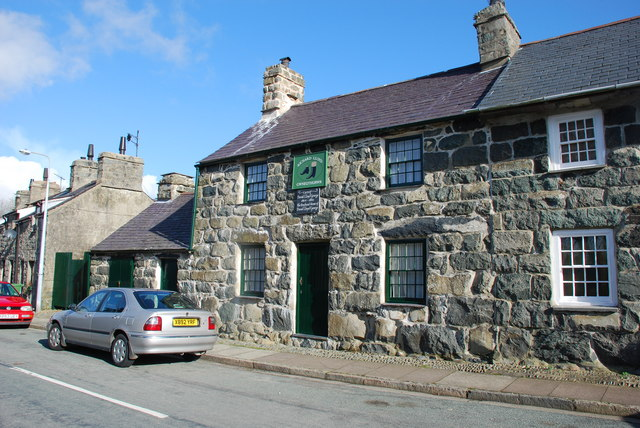
- Highgate

- Location within Gwynedd
- Population: 2,080 (2011)
- OS grid reference: SH473385
- Community: Llanystumdwy
- Principal area: Gwynedd
- Preserved county: Gwynedd
- Country: Wales
- Sovereign state: United Kingdom
- Post town: CRICCIETH
- Postcode district: LL52
- Post town: PWLLHELI
- Postcode district: LL53
- Dialling code: 01766
- Police: North Wales
- Fire: North Wales
- Ambulance: Welsh
- UK Parliament: Dwyfor Meirionnydd
- Senedd Cymru – Welsh Parliament: Dwyfor Meirionnydd
- List of places UK Wales Gwynedd 52.922°N 4.271°W Map of the community

Llanystumdwy (Welsh pronunciation: [ɬanəstɪmdʊɨ̯]) is a predominantly Welsh-speaking village, community and electoral ward in the Eifionydd area of Gwynedd in Wales. The village lies on the southern coast of the Llŷn Peninsula, with a beach facing Cardigan Bay, between Criccieth and Pwllheli at the point where the A497 road crosses the Afon Dwyfor.

The community and ward includes the villages of Chwilog, Afon Wen, Llanarmon, and Llangybi, plus the hamlets of Rhoslan and Pencaenewydd. It is represented by a county councillor on Gwynedd Council, and had a population of 1,919 in 2021. Historically it was part of Caernarfonshire, until the creation of Gwynedd in 1974.

David Lloyd George, the last Liberal Party leader to be British Prime Minister, was brought up in Llanystumdwy and lived there until he was 16. Lloyd George's grave in the village was designed by Clough Williams-Ellis, creator of the Italianate village of Portmeirion, across Cardigan Bay, who also designed the village chapel, Capel Moriah. The entrance gate to the memorial carries a slate plaque inscribed by Welsh artist Jonah Jones with a poem by Lloyd George's nephew William George, a former Archdruid of Wales. The art-deco Lloyd George Museum, another of Williams-Ellis' creations, is also in the village and features artefacts from the politician's life, an audio-visual theatre and a Victorian schoolroom. It is also licensed to conduct weddings.

The headquarters of Cadwalader's Ice Cream used to be located in the village at Parc Amaeth. Harlech Food Service, a major employer in the area, now occupies most of the Parc Amaeth enterprise park. A footpath leading past Lloyd George's grave follows a circular riverbank route through the Coed Trefan deciduous woodland. Another circular route leads off from the Wales Coastal Path through the village. The village football team C.P.D. Llanystumdwy play in the North Wales Coast West Premier Division. The local inn, Tafarn y Plu, has been open for 200 years and is associated with the playwright Wil Sam Jones.

The historian and writer Jan Morris lived in Llanystumdwy for over 50 years until her death in November 2020, first at her ancestral home Plas Trefan, and latterly in a converted stable block, Trefan Morys, in the grounds.

The landscape artist Gwilym Prichard was born in Llanystumdwy in 1931.

== Notable buildings ==
The village of stone houses is largely an architectural conservation area that has several listed buildings.

=== Tŷ Newydd ===
Lloyd George's former residence Tŷ Newydd – now home to the National Writing Centre of Wales – and his childhood home of Highgate, which forms part of the Lloyd George Museum are both listed.

=== Bridge and other buildings ===
The three-arched bridge (over the Afon Dwyfor) in the centre of the village dates from the late 17th or early 18th century and is Grade II listed. Often mistaken for Bont Fechan, which stands a mile away by a garden centre of the same name, it is claimed that the initials D LL G carved clearly into the downstream bridge parapet are the work of David Lloyd George himself. Ysgol Llanystumdwy, the village school where Lloyd George received all of his education (he never attended college or university) is still offering primary education to 4–11 year olds, run as a Welsh-medium school under the auspices of the Church in Wales.

A low-strung former terrace of cottages known as Lon Singrig is now one dwelling. Other buildings of note include the Tafarn y Plu (also known in English as "The Feathers"), the institute or village hall known as Neuadd y Pentref, which was financed by Lloyd George with compensation he received having won a libel case, the 19th century St John's Church, and the Moriah Methodist Chapel.

=== Penarth-fawr ===
Penarth Fawr is an important medieval hall house just outside the village.

=== Broom Hall ===
Broom Hall is an 18th-century Grade II* listed house, set in parkland which is designated Grade II on the Cadw/ICOMOS Register of Parks and Gardens of Special Historic Interest in Wales.

== Demographics ==
Census population of Llanystumdwy community
| Census | Population | Households |
|---|---|---|
| 2001 | 1,949 | |
| 2011 | 2,080 | |
| 2021 | 1,919 | 825 |
