= W. R. P. George =

Welsh lawyer and poet (1912–2006)

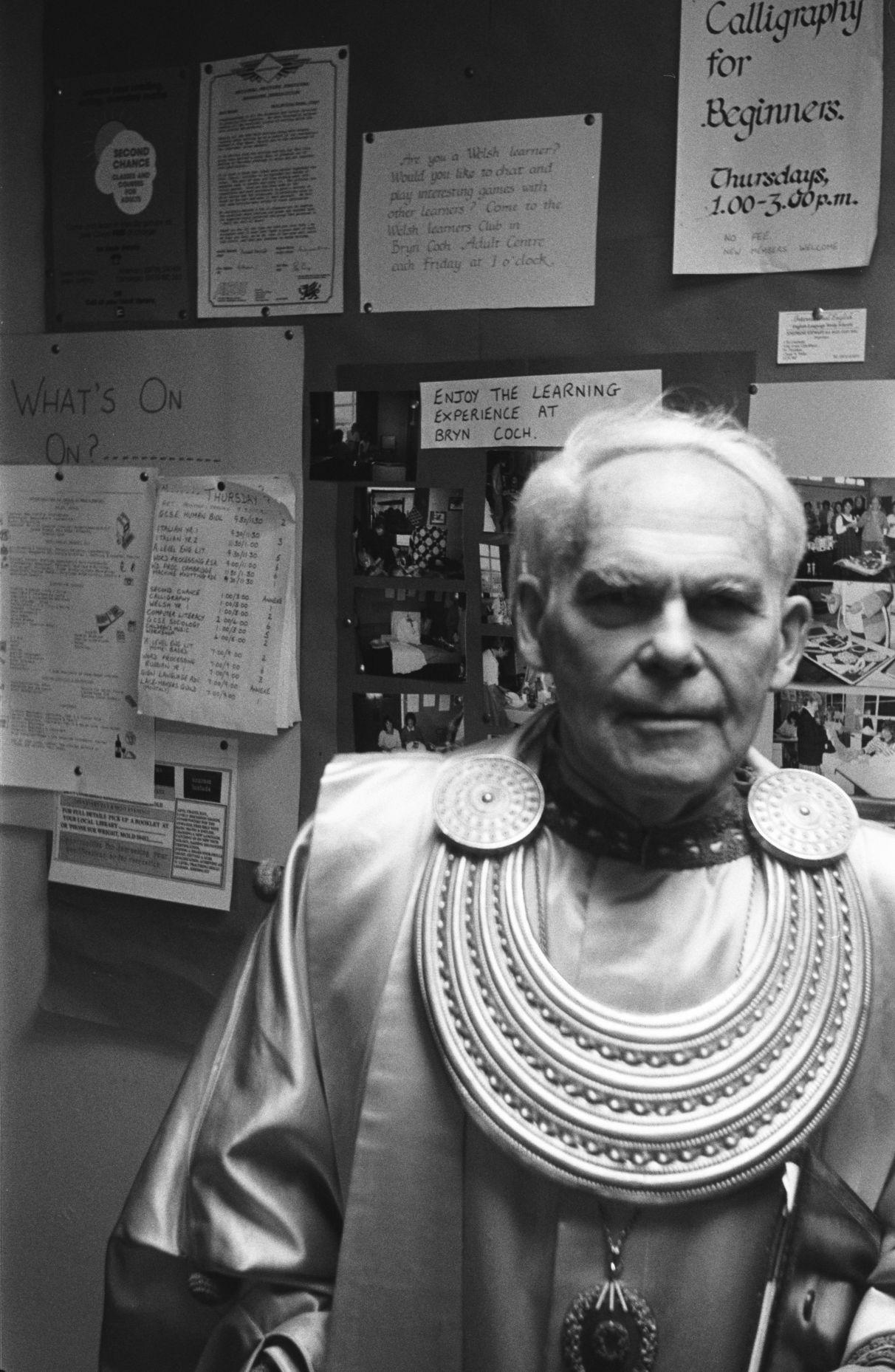
- W. R. P. George in 1990
- Born: William Richard Philip George; 20 October 1912; Criccieth
- Died: 20 November 2006 (aged 94)
- Education: Friars School, Bangor; Wrekin College
- Occupations: Solicitor; writer; Archdruid
- Spouses: Dora Harley; Greta Bogner
- Children: 4
- Relatives: David Lloyd George (uncle)

William Richard Philip George CBE (20 October 1912 – 20 November 2006) was a Welsh solicitor, poet, and Archdruid of Wales. He was the nephew of the Prime Minister, David Lloyd George.

== Life ==
George was born in Criccieth in North Wales. His father, William George, was the younger brother of David Lloyd George. While David Lloyd George pursued a career in national politics, his brother took care of the family firm of solicitors and served for 60 years as a member of Caernarfonshire County Council.

George was educated at Friars School, Bangor, where he initially joined the Officers Training Corps, but later applied to leave it. He went on to Wrekin College, Wellington, Shropshire. He studied law in the late 1920s at the private tutorial school, Gibson & Weldon, at 27 Chancery Lane. (One of his tutors was John Widgery, later Lord Chief Justice.) He took his articles in the early 1930s with the Clerk of Justices in Caernarfon, and he qualified as a solicitor in November 1934, when he joined his father's practice, William George & Son, in Porthmadog, Caernarvonshire. He continued to practise with the same firm until his death. At 94 years old, he was the fifth oldest practising solicitor in England and Wales, according to Law Society records (his father had continued to practise until he was 101). He served as Clerk to the Justices at Barmouth from 1948 to 1975, and as a deputy circuit judge in the Crown Court from 1975 to 1980. He was also solicitor to the National Eisteddfod.

Outside the law, he turned away from the family's Liberal leanings, to support Plaid Cymru. He was a conscientious objector in the Second World War, working on the land, and an independent councillor on Carnarvonshire County Council and then Gwynedd County Council from 1967 to 1996, serving as Chairman in 1982. He was made a Commander of the Order of the British Empire in 1996 for his services to local government.

He was also a Welsh language poet of some distinction, and was crowned at the National Eisteddfod in 1974 for his free metre poem Tân ("Fire"). He received an honorary doctorate from the University of Wales in 1988, and was Archdruid of Wales from 1990 to 1993, taking the bardic name "Ap Llysor" (meaning "son of Solicitor"). He was also Chairman of the Assembly of Welsh Counties, and Secretary of the Baptist chapel at Criccieth.

He published five volumes of Welsh poems, Dwyfor (1948), Cerddi'r Neraig ("Neraig Poems", 1968), Grawn Medi ("September Grapes", 1974), Tân ("Fire", 1979) and Dringo'r Ysgol ("Climbing the Ladder", 1989), and a collection Mydylau ("Haycocks") in 2004. He also wrote three biographies (including two of his uncle, Lloyd George, The Making of Lloyd George in 1976 and Lloyd George: backbencher in 1983, based on the archive that he inherited on his father's death in 1967) and his own autobiography, 88 Not Out (ISBN 1-870394-58-5), published in May 2001.

== Personal life ==
He was married twice. He first married Dora Harley in 1943, but they were divorced. He married Greta Bogner in 1953, having four children (three of them solicitors).

Preceded by Emrys Roberts	Archdderwydd of the National Eisteddfod of Wales; 1990–1993	Succeeded by John Gwilym Jones
