= Leslie Bonnet =

British politician

- Born: 22 August 1902; Watford, Hertfordshire, England
- Died: 10 December 1985 (aged 83) Criccieth, Gwynedd, Wales

Group Captain Leslie Bonnet (22 August 1902 – 10 December 1985) was a Royal Air Force officer, short-story writer and duck-breeder, the creator of the Honey Campbell breed of duck, later known as the Welsh Harlequin.

== Early life ==
Bonnet was born 1902 in Watford, Hertfordshire, England. His father was a bank manager in London's Chancery Lane; his mother was one of the Dudleys, a Staffordshire farming family He succeeded in winning a scholarship to Watford Boys Grammar School, from where he proceeded to St Catharine's College, Cambridge University, in 1920. He studied English and Law, obtaining a double first in 1923.

In the depressed 1920s, graduates were a glut on the market and he took a job selling "Watford" chocolates in Norfolk. He also stood as a Liberal parliamentary candidate in Watford but lost by a small number of votes.

== Pre-war years ==
Bonnet worked for the Bank of England for 15 years. In 1928, he married his first wife, Getrude Olive May, and had his first child, Bill, in 1930. In 1935 he was appointed the first full-time editor of the staff magazine – The Old Lady of Threadneedle Street Under his editorship, it became "a lively, absorbing journal of 200 sleek pages...packed with banking lore, poetry, literary articles, short stories and urbane correspondence, eagerly awaited and read by bankers all over the world." The December issues of the magazine became referred to as: "Uncle Leslie’s Bumper Christmas Annuals" During this period, he also published the Honorary Secretary's Guide (1938).

In 1938 he joined the Balloon Barrage, the only military service opened to someone at his advanced age. On 1 May 1939 he left the Bank and was appointed an acting pilot officer, second in command of E flight of 908 Squadron, Bethnal Green, one of the ten squadrons of barrage balloons in 30 Group of Balloon Command. He was quickly promoted to Flying Officer and then Flight Lieutenant.

== War years ==
In late autumn of 1939, Bonnet was posted to 30 Group Headquarters in Charlotte near the Middlesex Hospital as one of three Squadron Leader Operations Officers who operated the Balloons and next to 902 Squadron, Blackheath. Late in 1940, he was posted as second in command to 905, the West End Squadron. His next posting was to RAF Bomber Command, Cottesmore, as adjutant. He returned to 30 Group, which was at this time based in Chessington, in 1941. By this time he was Squadron Leader Air, with responsibility for balloon operations, under Wing Commander Barnes. He was given responsibility for the 450 London balloons, for the movement of the numerous extra squadrons of them that they were assembling and seconding overseas; and for the planning and siting of any new barrages that were established at home. Another responsibility was the Channel Convoy; each ship in the convoy flew a balloon from its stern.

In 1942, he was abruptly sent to the RAF Staff College in Gerrards Cross as a student, where he finished top of his class. At the beginning of 1943, he was posted to Stradishall Bomber Base in Suffolk as a Wing Commander where he spent 5 months as the administrative second in command. At this time, he divorced his first wife, Getrude Olive May, and married Joan Hutt, whom he had originally met when she exhibited at the Bank of England.

== Chinese mission ==
Later in 1943, he was asked by Group Captain "Daddy" Dawes (Head of Officers Postings at Bomber Command) and Air Marshal Saundby to be part of an RAF Training Mission to RAF Chengtu in China under Air Vice Marshal Pattinson. The aim of the mission was to train the Chinese Air Force to operate as an independent service, rather than a branch of the Army as previously. Unofficially, the Chinese invited the British to counteract the influence of the Americans, who were establishing themselves in China in strength. Bonnet worked hard to improve the administration of the service – when he arrived, he found that their filing system consisted of only one file entitled "General Matters". He learnt Chinese and became a great enthusiast for traditional Chinese drama. "At first the Chinese gave him the name 'Pa-nai' (the industrious professor) but soon this was changed to 'Pa-na-ta' (he who is susceptible to every moral influence)" The Mission eventually succeeded in making the Chinese Air Force an effective fighting Force; however, it later deserted to the Communist forces. Bonnet was also briefly captain of the Chinese Air Force football team.

== Staff college ==
Its work completed, the RAF mission returned to the UK in 1944. On a British aerodrome, the Chinese Ambassador to London awarded Bonnet the rare Order of the Cloud and Banner with Special Rosette "for distinguished services to China" With the rank of Group Captain, Bonnet took up duties as director of studies at the RAF Staff College at Gerrards Cross until demobilisation in October 1947. He was offered the permanent post of adjutant to the Staff College with the peacetime rank of Wing Commander, which he declined.

== Short story writer ==
In 1949 Bonnet and his wife and family, along with 1500 ducks and two dogs, moved to Criccieth in North Wales, where they had bought a ramshackle manor house with about 25 acres. They had 5 children including Lesley (b. 1944), Villette (b. 1945), Alice (b. 1947), Caroline (b. 1948) and Tom (b. 1951) and later numerous grandchildren.

In his adopted home, Bonnet had the opportunity to write; he published numerous short stories, principally for Argosy, as follows:

- The Awkwardness of Chin-T’ang, (ss) Magpie Mar 1953;
- Aye, and Back Again, (ss) Salmon & Trout Magazine (UK) Jan 1952
- The Bounciful Bed Company, (ss) Argosy (UK) Mar 1964;
- Brace of Pheasants, (ss) Argosy (UK) Jan 1959;
- The Bride, (ss) Argosy (UK) Oct 1958;
- Ch’iao-Chiao and the Bandit, (ss) Argosy (UK) Apr 1952;
- Ch'ih Chih Yu Ku Yen Chih Ch'eng Li, (ss) English Rev Mag (UK) Mar 1950
- Chinese Turtle, (ss) Argosy (UK) Jul 1958;
- Delectable Whiskers, (ss) Argosy (UK) Nov 1953;
- Devoted Concubine, (ss) Argosy (UK) Oct 1951;
- The Disappointed Concubine, (ss) Magpie Sep 1952;
- The Faithful Sing-Song Girl, (ss) Magpie Apr 1951;
- The Friendly Generals, (ss) Magpie Sep 1951;
- Game with a Goddess, (ss) Argosy (UK) May 1958;
- The General Rejoins His Army, (ss) Magpie May 1953;
- The Girl in the Green Tree, (ss) Argosy (UK) Jun 1964;
- Heavenly Condescension, (ss) Argosy (UK) Aug 1964;
- Lotus Flower, (ss) Argosy (UK) Dec 1956;
- Mr. Hedderwick's Holiday, (ss) Argosy (UK) Jul 1954;
- Mr Redcoat, (ss) in J. Pudney. Pick of Today's Short Stories 1960
- Proud Lady Yun, (ss) Argosy (UK) Mar 1954;
- Royal Monument Pavilion, (ss) Argosy (UK) Jul 1951;
- Settled Out of Court, (ss) John Bull 1 Feb 1958;
- Scamp, (ss) Veterinary Review (UK) Dec 1958
- Settled Out of Court, (ss) John Bull 1 Feb 1958
- Silken Lady, (ss) Argosy (UK) Apr 1953;
- Silken Portrait, (ss) Argosy (UK) Jul 1960;
- The Silken Screen, (ss) Argosy (UK) Sep 1957;
- Ta-Ra-Ra Boom!, (ss) Argosy (UK) Aug 1956;
- The Ticklehampton Stone, (ss) John Bull (UK) 1955
- Tiger General, (ss) Argosy (UK) May 1951;
- There are Two Sides to Every Question, (ss) Printers Prophet (UK) 1938
- The Two Weddings of Ying Er, (ss) Magpie Aug 1951;
- The Trigamist (ss) John Bull (UK) Sept 1955
- White Snake Lady, (ss) Argosy (UK) Apr 1953
- From a Welsh Valley, (ss) Salmon & Trout Magazine Sept 1952
- It Won't Go Any Further (ss) Veterinary Review (UK) Dec 1961
- A Wreath for Aunt Hannah, (ss) Argosy (UK) Oct 1956.

He also published plays, such as The Nine Fathers (1970), which won the Maynard Cup at the Wales Final Festival of One Act Plays in 1969, as well as books such as Chinese Fairy Tales (1958). The children's book The Terrible Nung Guama (1978) was a retelling of one of his stories. He also acted for a time as area representative of a large unit trust company and in 1963 was acting Hon Secretary, Council for the Preservation of Rural Wales, Caernarvonshire Branch.

== Duck breeding ==
In Criccieth he continued breeding ducks. While in Hertfordshire he had created a new duck breed, the Honey Campbell, from two colour mutations in his flock of Khaki Campbells; it was later renamed the Welsh Harlequin. He also created the Whalesbury Hybrid, a cross between the Aylesbury Duck and the Welsh Harlequin.

His book Practical Duck Keeping was published by Land Books in 1960.

== Memorials ==
Leslie Bonnet died in December 1985, aged 83. He is buried in Criccieth Cemetery and there is woodland named in his honour close to Ymwlch, as well as a memorial bench on Garth Pier, Bangor. He was described in his obituary as a "countryman...rubicund, well-fleshed but never flabby, and abounding with energy".
