= Garth Pier =

Structure in Bangor, Gwynedd, Wales

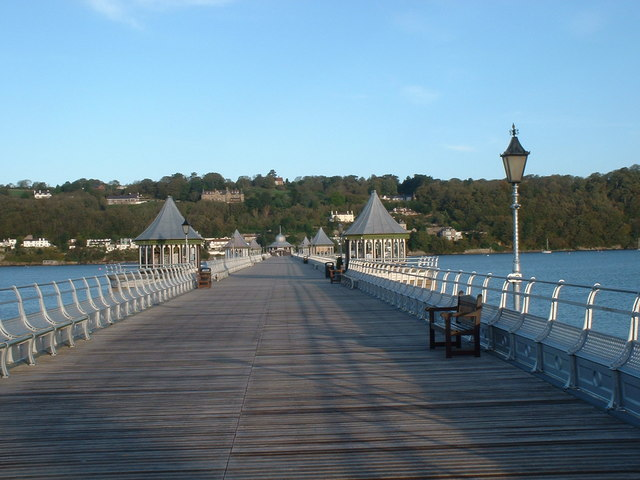
- Carries: Pedestrians
- Spans: Menai Strait
- Location: Garth, Bangor, Wales
- Coordinates: 53°14′18.58″N 4°7′26.76″W
- Official name: Garth Pier
- Owner: Bangor City Council
- Toll: £1.00 per adult

Characteristics
- Total length: As built: 1,550 feet (470 m); Current: 1,500 feet (460 m)

History
- Designer: J.J. Webster
- Opening date: 14 May 1896

Garth Pier (Welsh: Pier y Garth; also known as Bangor Pier) is a Grade II listed structure in the Garth area of Bangor, in Gwynedd. Wales. At 1,500 feet (460 m) in length, it is the second-longest pier in Wales, and the ninth longest in the British Isles.

== Construction ==
Designed by J. J. Webster of Westminster, London, the 1,550 feet (470 m) pier has cast-iron columns, with the rest of the metal structure made in steel, including the handrails. The wooden deck has a series of octagonal kiosks with roofs, plus street lighting, which lead to a pontoon landing stage for pleasure steamers on the Menai Strait.

== History ==
Opened to the public on 14 May 1896, the ceremony was performed by George Douglas-Pennant, 2nd Baron Penrhyn. A 3 ft (914 mm) railway for handling baggage which had been included in the design, was removed in 1914.

The pontoon handled the pleasure steamers of the Liverpool and North Wales Steamship Company to/from Blackpool, Liverpool and Douglas, Isle of Man. In 1914, the cargo steamer SS Christiana broke free from the pontoon overnight, and caused considerable damage to the neck of the pier. A resulting gap to the pontoon was temporarily bridged by the Royal Engineers, which remained in place until 1921 due to the onset of World War I. By this time, additional damage had occurred, and repairs took a few months over the originally envisaged few weeks.

== Threat of demolition ==
In 1971, the pier closed on safety grounds, with ownership being passed to Arfon Borough Council in 1974. The council took the immediate decision to demolish the pier, but Bangor City Council objected, obtaining a Grade II listing for the structure, with the planning officer considering it one of the three finest surviving piers in Great Britain.

Purchasing the pier for a nominal 1p in 1975, in 1982 renovation, undertaken by Alfred McAlpine commenced, taking until 1988 to complete. Financial assistance was given from the National Heritage Memorial Fund, the Welsh Office and Manpower Services Commission. The pier was reopened by George Paget, 7th Marquess of Anglesey on 7 May 1988.

== Present ==
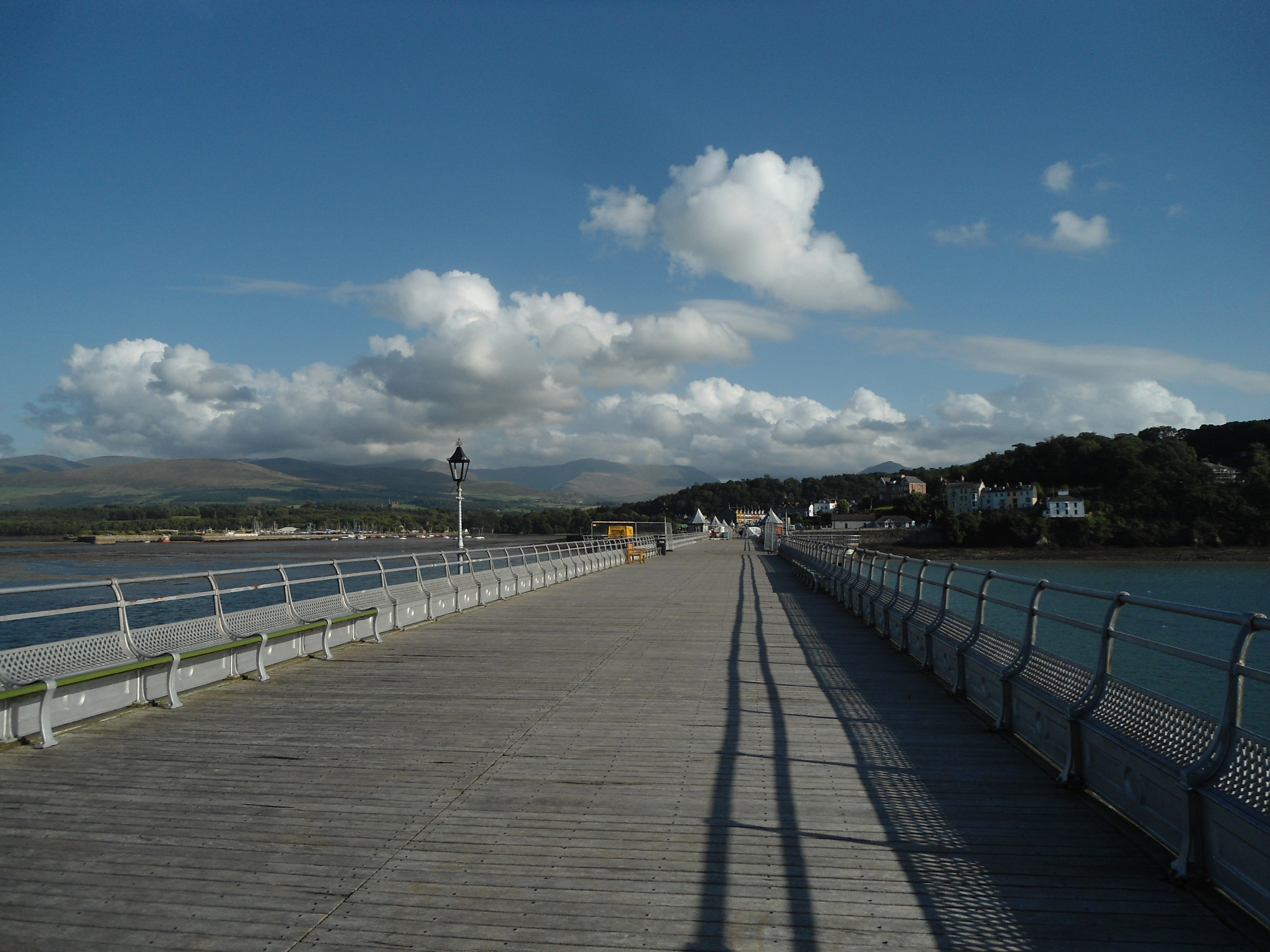
The pier in August 2018

Now Grade II* listed, there is a £1.00 toll for users. The pier gates remain open until 9 pm in summer, with pre-booked night fishing available.

Due to its location and length, at low tide the site is a haven for local seabirds to access the rich mud of the Menai Strait, allowing close viewing of oystercatchers, redshanks, curlews, little egrets and the occasional great cormorant.

A large kiosk at the end of the pier, houses a traditional seaside tearoom, with smaller kiosks rented out to local small businesses. The kiosks presently house a popular cafe and ice cream vendor, who also supplies crabbing gear, a local artists gallery/giftshop, a traditional sweet shop with vintage arcade, the friends of Garth Pier gift shop and finally, a welsh food and gift shop. One kiosk was formerly used by the Bangor branch of the Soroptimists. There are also seats along the promenade, with memorial benches to RAF Group Captain Leslie Bonnet and writer Joan Hutt.

It was announced in August 2017 that major restoration work would take place at a cost of £1million, as the Pier has not received any major maintenance works for many years and is now in need of a refurbishment. The last restoration and renovation programme was in the 1980s. The work will be funded by Bangor City Council and is likely to take up to three years to complete. Initially, the pier remained fully open to the public during the restoration works. However, following a structural report which found the pier head to be in a dangerous condition, it was closed to the public on a temporary basis in June 2018. The bulk of the pier is now accessible. However, increased costs meant that completing work to the pier head is continuing. In March 2021 the pier head re-opened to the public.

Historically, dogs were never allowed on the pier, but following a trial period, it was decided that the ban would be abolished. The pier was suggested to be a pedestrian and cyclist bridge option for a Third Menai Crossing, due it extending halfway across the strait, but was deemed unrealistic.
