= Joan Hutt =

British artist (1913–1985)

Joan Villette Hutt
- Born: 16 September 1913; Aspenden, Hertfordshire, England
- Died: 19 January 1985 (aged 71); Llandudno, Conwy, Wales
- Education: Camberwell College of Arts, Clapham School of Art
- Known for: Painting
- Movement: Expressionism

Joan Villette Hutt (1913–1985) was a British artist who spent most of her career in North Wales.

== Early life ==
Joan Villette Hutt was born on 16 September 1913 in Aspenden, Hertfordshire, England Her father, John Hutt MBE, was posted with the Ministry of Food in Malta at that time, but had sent his wife back to England to give birth. Mother and child returned to Malta after the birth. At the outbreak of the First World War, the whole family returned to the UK.

Joan's paternal family, the Hutts, were originally of French Huguenot extraction. Notable ascendants included John Hutt (1746–1794), Royal Navy Flag-captain (buried in Westminster Abbey), John Hutt (1795–1880), Governor of Western Australia from 1839 to 1846, and Sir William Hutt (1801–1882), a British Liberal Politician who was heavily involved in the colonization of New Zealand and Southern Australia.

== Education ==
Hutt was educated privately and then at Sutton High School (London), where she excelled in drawing. She then studied fine art at the Camberwell College of Art and then at the Clapham School of Art.

Hutt spent her early years painting in Paris, followed by two years in Frankfurt

== Bank of England ==
Hutt returned to Britain, obtaining a position at the Bank of England in the 1930s. From 1935, she regularly exhibited her paintings at the Bank of England Arts Society. It was said at her first exhibition: "Easily the most sensational work in the show was that of its youngest contributor, Miss Joan Hutt, who is only 19.. her fine study...entitled 'Trees' should place her in the front rank...". In 1936, she was awarded first prize in oil painting at the Bank of England Arts Exhibition for her painting "Still Life" whose "emphatic rhythmic properties are conveyed with buoyant verve" and a "work in which form, colour and texture combine in a robust effect – with a hint of Chirico in the choice of material" In 1938, she again received first prize for her work "Girl in a Chair" In the same exhibition, her painting "Winter Landscape" was described as "a quite extraordinary picture – across this chilly canvas faint spirits move against a bleak background of variegated blue"

At the Bank of England, she also met Leslie Bonnet, who was editor of the Bank's literary magazine The Old Lady of Threadneedle Street. They married in 1943.

== Move to Wales ==
Hutt moved with her family from Flaunden in Hertfordshire to a ramshackle manor house, Ymwlch Fawr, near Criccieth, North Wales, in 1949. She continued painting, finding inspiration in the Welsh landscapes, and reared a family of five children (Lesley b. 1944, Villette b. 1945, Alice b. 1947, Caroline b. 1948 and Tom b. 1951).

From 1963, after her children had grown, Joan devoted herself full-time to teaching and practising art. She regularly tutored on landscape painting and founded the Criccieth W.E.A. Art class in 1965. She was co-founder of the Porthmadog Art Club and a member of the "North Wales Group" of artists which included Sir Kyffin Williams, Elis Gwyn, Tom Gerrard, Roy Ostle, Karel Lek, Jonah Jones, Arthur Pritchard, Claudia Williams, Donald McIntyre, Helen Steinthal and Peter Chadwick.

Every Thursday, local artists came to her studio at Ymwlch Fawr to paint and also to discuss art and articles published in the Arts Review. Hutt's subjects were often members of her family and her eldest daughter, Lesley, was her muse and the subject of many of her portraits.

== Art exhibitions ==
Hutt regularly exhibited her work in North Wales as well as across the UK, France and Germany. A selected list of her exhibitions is given below:

- Bank of England Art Exhibition, London 1935–68;
- Y Gegin, Criccieth 1965, 1966;
- Galerie Villette, Criccieth 1969–73;
- The Church Room, Criccieth 1969, 1973;
- Penlan Art Studio, Pwllheli 1965;
- Institute Buildings, Caernarfon;
- Newborough Arms Hotel, Caernarfon 1961;
- Hercules Hall, Portmeirion 1964;
- Terry's Art Gallery, Caernarfon 1964;
- Paris Salon, Paris 1964–73;
- David Griffith Art Gallery, Cardiff 1966;
- Caldicott Gallery, Leicester 1967;
- The Town Hall, Dolgellau 1968;
- Royal Institute of Oil Painters Exhibition, London 1968;
- United Society of Artists Exhibition, London 1968, 1969;
- National Society's Exhibition, London 1968–73;
- Tuhwnt-i-r Afon Inn, Rhydyclafy 1969;
- Browns Gallery, Chester 1970;
- Public Art Gallery, Sunderland 1970;
- Beecroft Art Gallery, Southend-on-Sea 1970;
- Edward Pease Art Gallery, Darlington 1970;
- The Art Gallery, Huddersfield 1971;
- Galerie Vallombreuses, Biarritz 1970;
- Oxford Playhouse, Oxford 1972;
- Galerie Dresdner Bank, Frankfurt 1973;
- Sutton House, Shrewsbury 1974;
- Nottingham Playhouse, Nottingham 1974;
- Woodstock Gallery, London 1974;
- German Chamber of Industry & Commerce, London 1974;
- Bad Nauheimer Kurtheater, Germany 1975;
- Société des Artistes Français, Paris 1976;
- Redbourn Studio & Gallery, Hertfordshire, 1976;
- Deutsche Bank, Hannover, Germany;

== Reviews ==
Hutt's exhibitions were extensively reviewed; a selection of reviewers' comments can be seen below:

"The exhibition of 40 paintings at Port Meirion by Joan Hutt is a first 'one-man show' that registers for a well-known North Wales artist, prevented for years from giving full expression to her talent;

"Her painting is of a vibrant artist who allows a free expression of their innermost feelings, despite their respect for rules and a certain sensuality which is revealed in the key and pasted in relief" (translated from French);

"She uses oils and her paintings exude a sensual delight and a sense of the framework, the skeleton of natural forms";

"The Welsh scene has certainly afforded a very fruitful source of inspiration to Mrs Hutt as a water-colourist, Mrs Hutt is specially impressive in her flower subjects with their engaging air of spontaneous simplicity."

"Joan Hutt's exhibitions in Britain and the Continent have made a significant contribution to highlight the creations of Wales-based artists"

== Hutt's philosophy of painting ==
Even though Hutt lost her eyesight in her late 60s, she continued to paint. She once described her philosophy on painting as follows: "As far back as I can remember myself I am drawing or painting. I have always wanted to paint, to express my joy in form and colour. My especial delight is people's heads. I love to convey personalities, any personalities onto canvas. I regard myself as an expressionist. I paint what I feel strongly about. I feel that paintings should be timeless, personal and original statements of the artists. I do not believe in fashions or theories. I want to be myself".

== Memorials ==
Hutt died on 19 January 1985 at Llandudno General Hospital, aged 72. She is buried with her husband in Criccieth Cemetery. There is a memorial bench in her honour on Garth Pier at Bangor.
