= Cadwaladers =

Welsh cafe chain

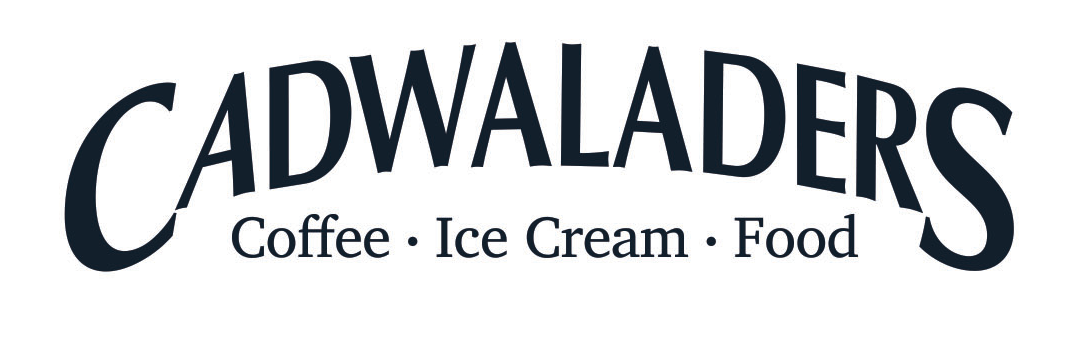

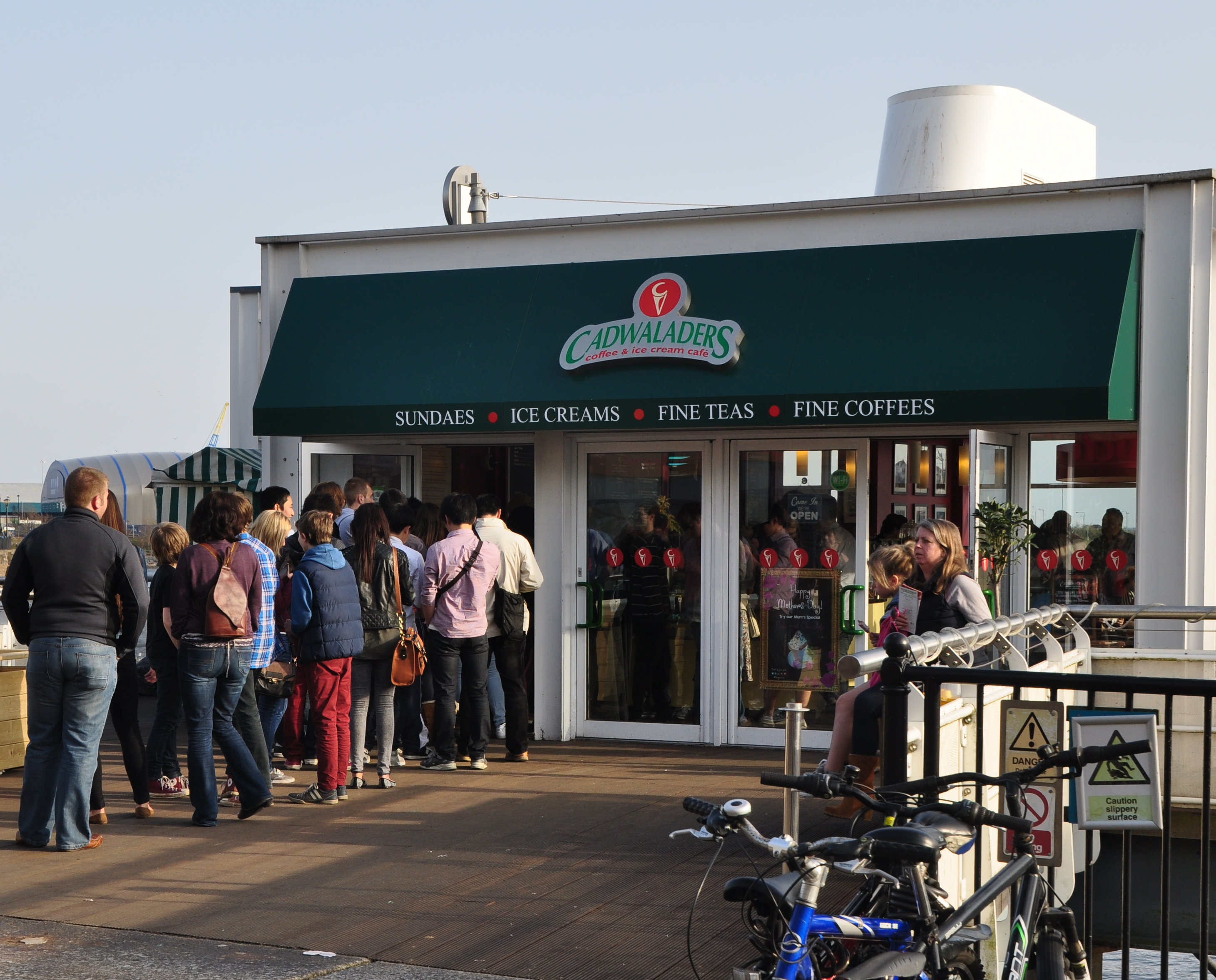
- Branch in Cardiff, Wales
- Company type: Coffee, ice cream and food cafe
- Industry: Ice cream parlour/cafe/coffee shop
- Founded: Criccieth, Gwynedd, Wales (1927; 99 years ago)
- Founder: David and Hannah Cadwalader
- Headquarters: UK, Cardiff, Wales
- Number of locations: 9
- Area served: Wales, Staffordshire
- Products: Ice cream, cakes, coffee, food
- Website: www.cadwaladers.com

Cadwaladers is a family-run chain of cafes that originated in Gwynedd, Wales.

== History ==
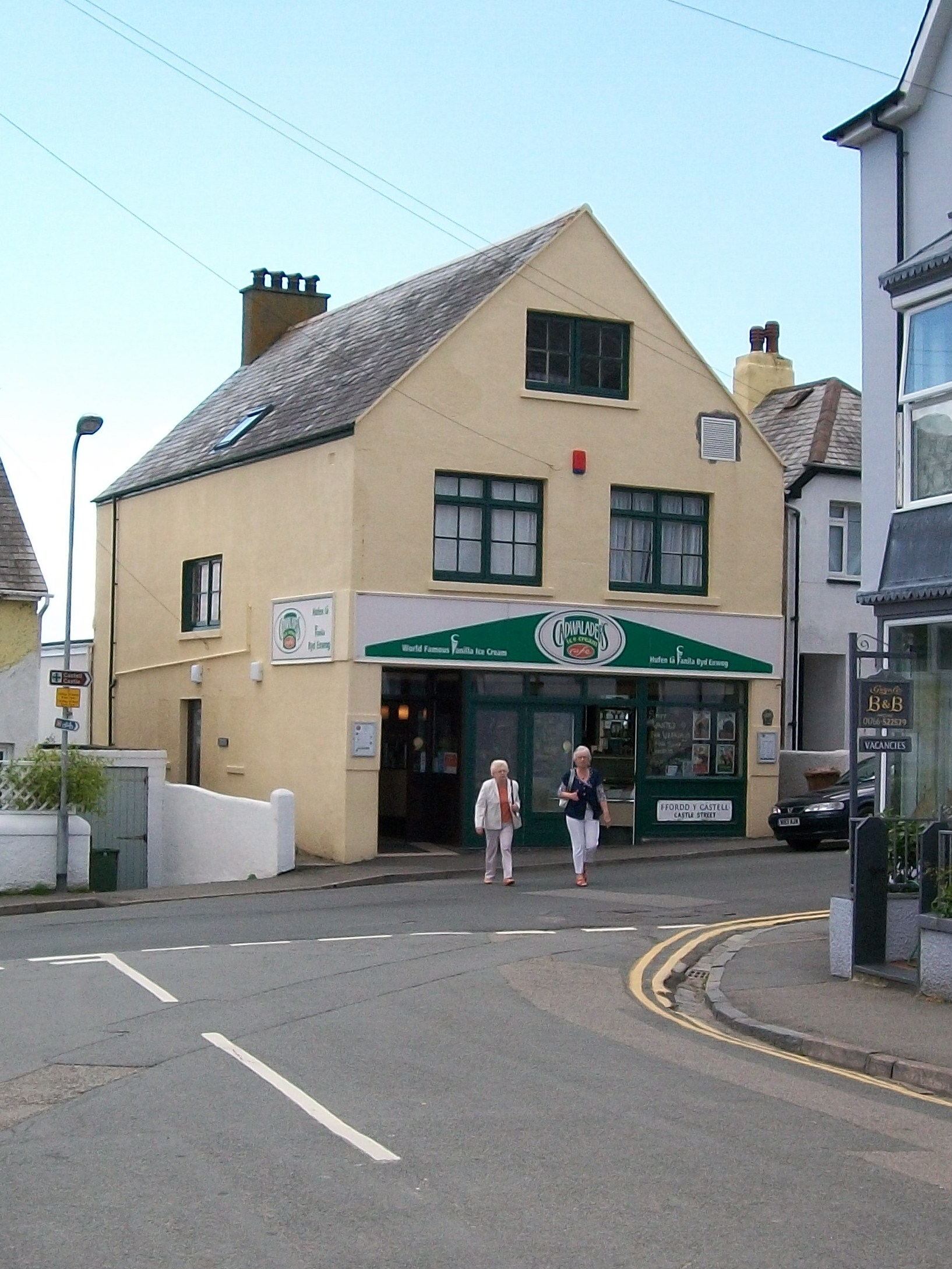
Branch in Criccieth

The original ice cream parlour was introduced by husband and wife David and Hannah Cadwalader in 1927 in Criccieth and was originally run as a general store. The business was passed onto one of their children, Dafydd, who changed the emphasis of the store and removed fish from sale. He sold, from the end of World War II, vanilla ice cream that Hannah Cadwalader developed. The vanilla ice cream was made on the premises with a secret recipe, which is no longer used. The tagline of the vanilla ice cream was six lbs of "shan't tell you" and "a great deal of love and care."

After Dafydd Cadwalader died in 1983, Cadwalader's was bought by a family of Welsh entrepreneurs, The Andrews Family who also own Castle Leisure. The owners expanded the business to cover North Wales and Cardiff. Today, Cadwalader's stores can be found in Wales at Betws-y-Coed, Barry Island, Criccieth, Porthmadog, Tenby Porthcawl and three stores in Cardiff. There is also a store in England at Trentham Gardens.

As well as the original Cadwalader's vanilla ice cream and a variety of flavoured ice creams and sundaes, the cafe also sells its own bespoke blends of coffee, loose leaf tea, and other hot drinks.

The Criccieth store holds weekly live jazz out of high season from September to June.

== Administration ==
In September 2015, the business went into administration after a number of setbacks including losses following the opening of a new store in Manchester in 2010, the forced closure of the Portmeirion store in 2013 and poor sales in Summer 2015. The administrators Deloitte were appointed but the company was bought out by the management team. Five of the stores had to close, with the loss of 10 jobs, but the restructuring secured 92 jobs.
