= St Deiniol's Church =

St Deiniol's Church may mean:

- St Deiniol's Church, Criccieth
- St Deiniol's Church, Hawarden
- St Deiniol's Church, Itton, Monmouthshire
- St Deiniol's Church, Llanddaniel Fab
- St Deiniol's Church, Worthenbury, Wrexham County Borough

== See also ==
- St Deiniol's Library
