= Robert Jones (aerodynamicist) =

Welsh aerodynamicist (1891–1962)

Robert Jones (7 November 1891 – 17 March 1962) was a Welsh mathematician and aerodynamicist. He was one of the world's leading experts on the stability of airships.

He was born at Criccieth, Caernarfonshire to John Jones and his wife Sarah Mary. He attended the local Board School and Porthmadog County School before entering the University College of North Wales in 1908. His primary course of study was in mathematics which he was taught by Professor George H. Bryan, F.R.S., an English applied mathematician who was an authority on thermodynamics and aeronautics. Additionally Jones studied Welsh philology taught by Sir J. Morris-Jones. He won prizes including the R.A. Jones prize in mathematics (1910) and was considered an extraordinary student. In 1911 he graduated with a second class honours degree in Pure Mathematics, following this with a first class honours degree in Applied Mathematics in 1912.

From 1913 to 1916 he held an 1851 Exhibition Science Research Scholarship studying at the University of Göttingen and later at the National Physics Laboratory in Teddington. In this period he published an important paper with George H. Bryan called "Discontinuous Fluid Motion Past the Bent Plane, with Special Reference to Aeroplane Problems", which was seen as an important development in the understanding of aerodynamics. After this he joined the staff of the Aerodynamics Division of the National Physical Laboratory, staying there until his retirement in 1953.

His initial work at the National Physical Laboratory was on the mathematical theory of aeroplane stability. Later he focused on wind tunnel experiments aimed at developing the stability of airships and also torpedoes. In 1923 he was granted the R.38 Memorial Prize of the Royal Aeronautical Society. Following the loss of the Airship R101 he took a leading role in the investigation into the accident.

He died on 17 March 1962 at Stanwell, aged 70.
