= Old Town Hall, Criccieth =

Municipal Building in Criccieth, Wales

Old Town Hall
- Hen Neuadd y Dref Cricieth (Welsh)
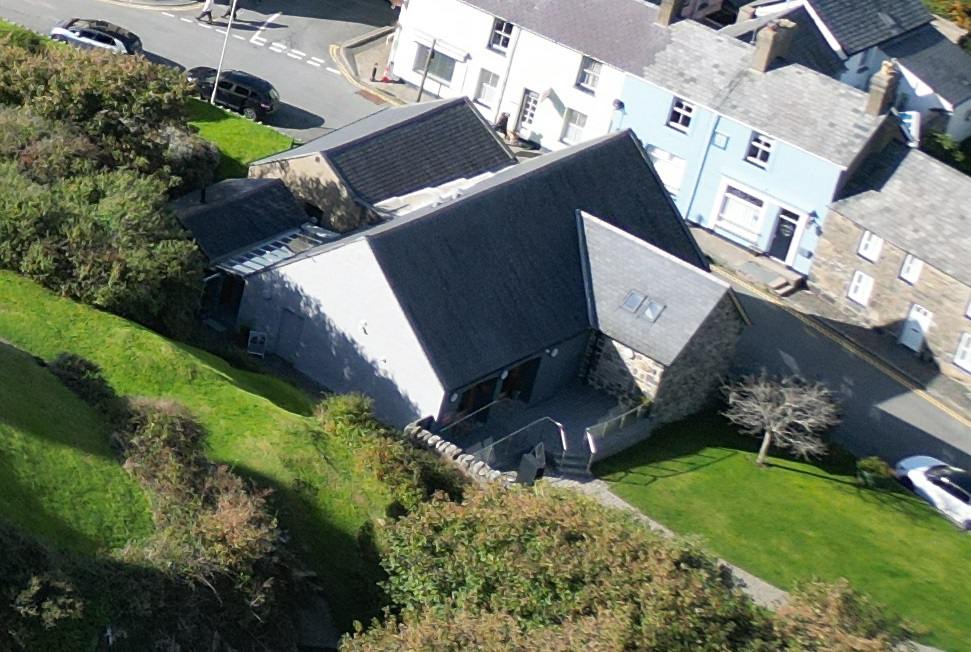
- The old town hall from the air in 2022

- Shown in Gwynedd
- 52.9167°N 4.2326°W
- Location: Castle Terrace, Criccieth

History
- Built: c.1795

Site notes
- Architectural style: Neoclassical style

The Old Town Hall (Welsh: Hen Neuadd y Dref Cricieth) is a municipal building on Castle Terrace in Criccieth, Gwynedd, Wales. The structure is currently used as a visitor centre.

== History ==
The building stands within the grounds of Criccieth Castle on a site which was occupied by a tithe barn in medieval times. The present structure was commissioned to accommodate the mayor, the two bailiffs and other officials of the borough and was originally referred to as the Guildhall. It was designed in the neoclassical style, built in rubble masonry and dates back to at least 1795. The design involved a symmetrical main frontage facing northeast with two segmental headed openings to the left of a short gabled wing, which was projected forward, with a short blind wall to the right of it. Internally, the principal room was the main hall.

By the mid-19th century borough officials were no longer being appointed. Part of the building was subsequently used as a school which, following the implementation of the Elementary Education Act 1870, was designated a Board School. An extension was erected to the rear to accommodate the custodian of the castle. Improvement commissioners were appointed to administer the town and to take over the borough's property, including the town hall, in 1870. The borough was formally abolished under the Municipal Corporations Act 1883.

The improvement commissioners were replaced by an urban district council in 1894. The council continued to meet in the town hall until the Memorial Hall was completed in 1925. A stone known as the Carreg Cam, which had been made available in medieval times so that people could mount their horses, was relocated from the town hall to the Memorial Hall shortly thereafter. During the storm of 1927, residents from the area to the east of the castle, known as Abermarchnad, were allowed to use the town hall as a refuge.

The building was subsequently used as a community events venue and, from 1963, it served a theatre known as Theatr y Gegin; the plays of the author and playwright, W. S. Jones, were first performed there. In 1976, the theatre closed and it subsequently served as a venue for exhibitions and other local events. Following an extensive programme of refurbishment works, which included the installation of interactive displays, the building re-opened as a visitor centre in April 2017.
