= Paul Roberts (footballer, born 1977) =

Welsh footballer

Personal information
- Full name: Paul Alan Roberts
- Date of birth: 29 July 1977 (age 49)
- Place of birth: Criccieth, Wales
- Position: Forward

Senior career*
Years	Team	Apps	(Gls)
1993–1996	Porthmadog	34	(20)
1996–1998	Wrexham	1	(0)
1998–2006	Bangor City	204	(95)
2006	Rhyl	7	(1)
2006–2007	Bangor City	14	(6)
2007–2008	Porthmadog	31	(15)
2008–2009	Welshpool Town	33	(17)
2009	Porthmadog	15	(7)
2009–2010	Newtown	19	(12)

International career
	Wales U21	1	(0)
- * Club domestic league appearances and goals

Paul Alan Roberts (born 29 July 1977) is a Welsh former footballer who mostly played in the League of Wales, scoring over 100 goals.

He has played in the English football league, making just one substitute appearance for then-Second Division side Wrexham.

Internationally, he has been capped for the Wales under-21 national football team.
