= Criccieth Golf Course =

Former golf club in Wales

Criccieth Golf Club
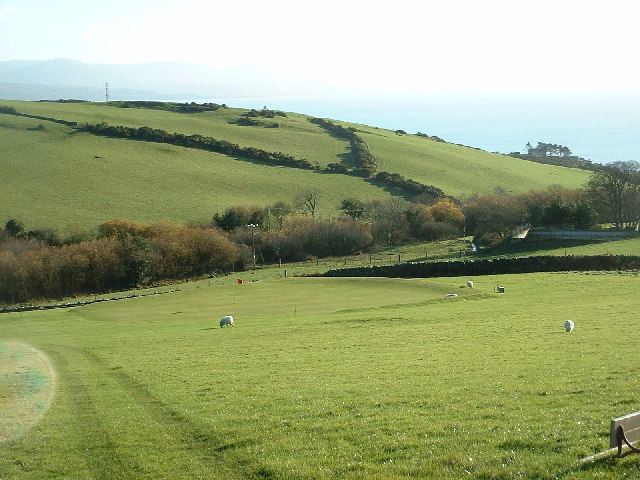

- Criccieth Golf Club within Wales
- 52.92991°N 4.226226°W

Club information
- Location: Gwynedd, Wales
- Type: Private
- Tota holes: 18
- Website: cricciethgolfclub-northwales.co.uk

Criccieth Golf Club (Welsh: Clwb Golff Cricieth) was a golf club based just outside Criccieth at Gwynedd, Wales. A 5787-yard-long, 18 hole hilltop course with par 69 and SSS of 68. The club opened in 1905. In 2015 the club was named among Bryn Terfel's favourite courses in the “Wales Golf Annual Brochure”. This club had a "members only" policy and closed on 31 December 2017.
