= Castle Leisure =

Welsh bingo club company

- Company type: Private
- Industry: Gambling
- Founded: Mid-19th century
- Headquarters: Cardiff, Wales
- Website: castle.bingo

Castle Leisure is a privately owned company in existence since the mid-19th century and has been based in the same Cardiff office since 1856. Operating a number of leisure ventures down the years, they now own a chain of purpose-built bingo clubs.

== Castle Bingo ==
Castle Leisure has eight purpose-built bingo clubs in the area of South Wales and three others located in Barnes Hill Birmingham, Bootle Liverpool and Corby, Northamptonshire. The company built the first ever purpose-built bingo hall in the UK, the Canton Castle, reopened on 26 May 2016 following extensive renovation work after a fire struck the building in July 2015.

They company's bingo roots started with small traditional clubs in South Wales including Abercynon, Kenfighill, Porth, Ebbw Vale and Pontypridd. The last of the traditional bingo clubs was Pontypridd. In 2006 the company built their Nantgarw club which quickly become a flagship club for the company, serving the local community.

In early 2011 Castle Leisure expanded its South Wales Enterprise into England purchasing a further Three Bingo Halls and transforming them to resemble the look and layout of the previous eight. The newly purchased clubs are situated at Barnes Hill, Birmingham, Bootle, Liverpool and Corby, Northamptonshire. They have two clubs in Cardiff, the others are in Bridgend, Merthyr Tydfil, Nantgarw, Neath, Uskway Newport, Swansea, Liverpool, Birmingham and Corby. The Uskway club in Newport, Nantgarw and Neath Clubs seat in excess of 1,000 people.
