= St Deiniol's Church, Criccieth =

Residential flats in Criccieth, Wales

Coordinates: 52.9202°N 4.2310°W

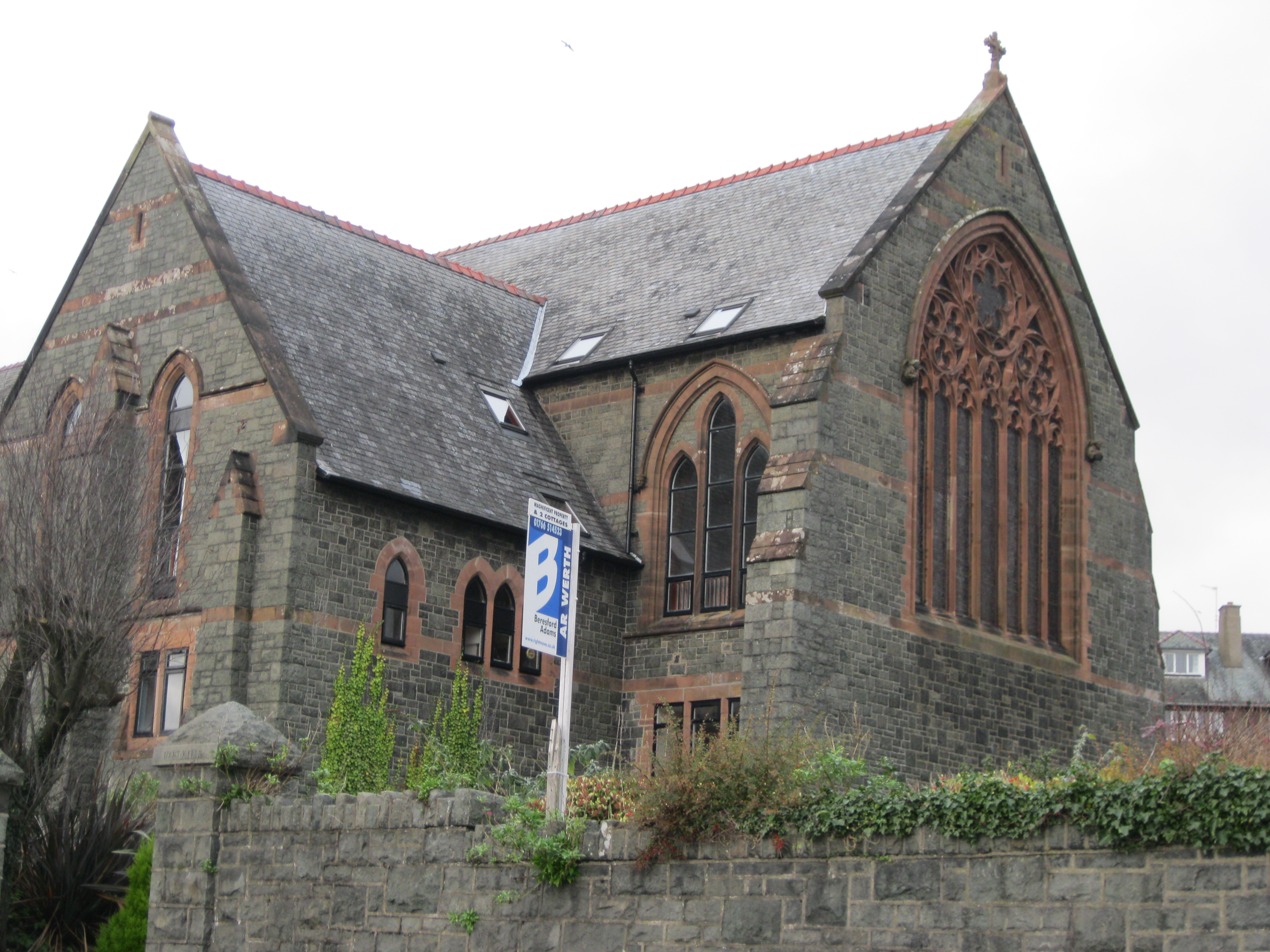
St Deiniol's Church

St Deiniol's Church (Welsh: Eglwys Deiniol Sant), was a church in Criccieth, Gwynedd, Wales (grid reference SH500381). It was built between 1884 and 1887.

The church was designed by Douglas and Fordham, a Chester firm of architects. Its plan was cruciform, consisting of a six-bay nave, a three-bay chancel with sanctuary, north and south transepts, and a south porch. It had a short spire with low, broad, broaches. A west tower was planned but never built. The church closed in 1988, and it has been converted into residential flats.

== See also ==
- List of new churches by John Douglas
