= RAF Chengtu =

Former Royal Air Force station in China

RAF Chengtu
- 成都皇家空军站
- Chengdu, Sichuan Province in China

Site information
- Type: Royal Air Force station
- Operator: Royal Air Force
- Other site facilities: Radar, training facilities, command and control

Site history
- Built: 1943
- Built for: Air operations in the China-Burma-India Theater
- In use: 1945
- Battles/wars: World War II

Garrison information
- Past commanders: Vice-Marshal Lawrence A Pattinson (RAF Training Mission China)
- Garrison: No. 517 AMES, Field Signals Unit

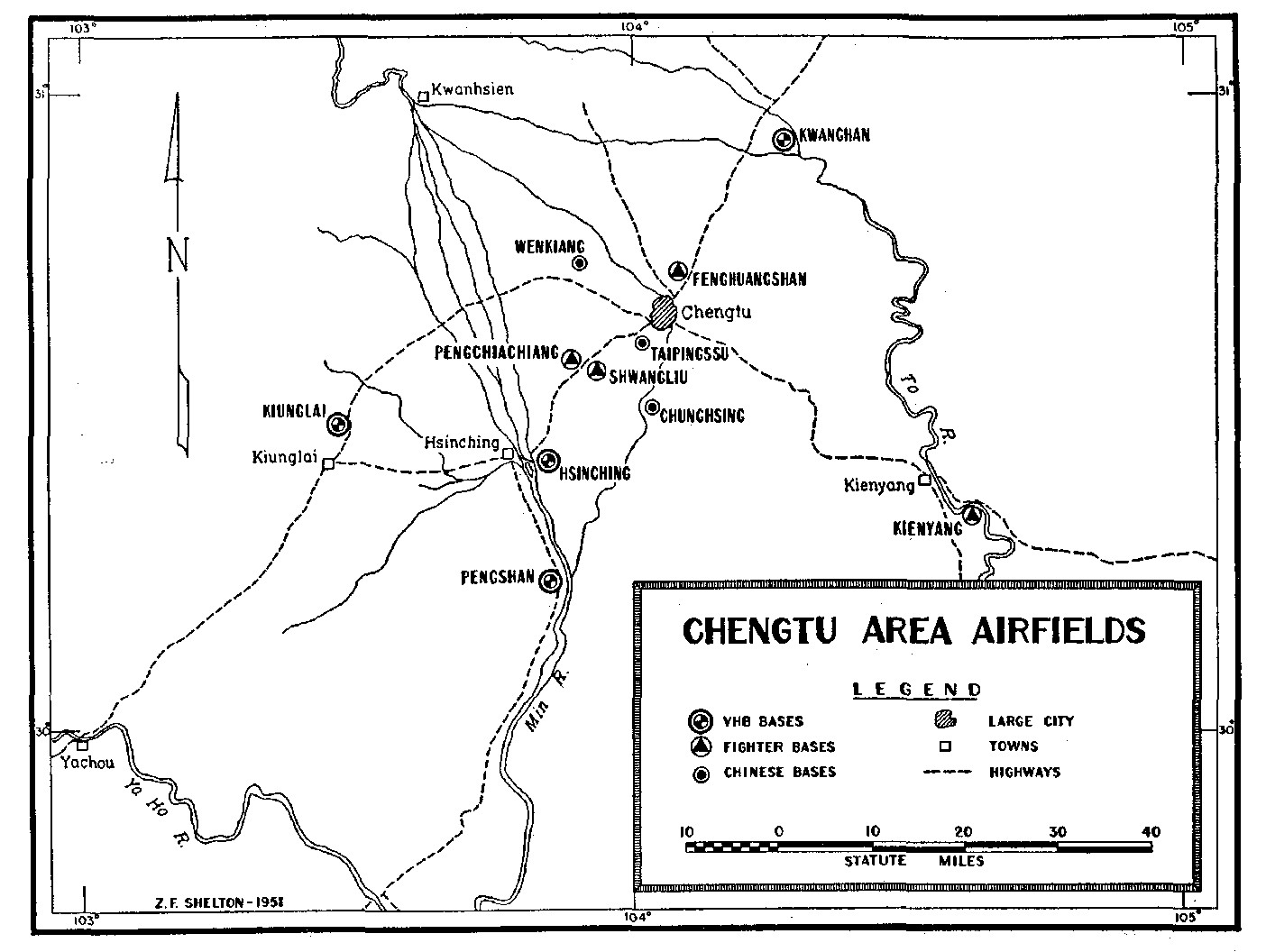
Chengtu Area Airfields

Royal Air Force Chengtu or more simply RAF Chengtu is a former Royal Air Force station located in Chengdu, Sichuan Province, China.

== History ==
RAF Chengtu was established as part of the RAF’s Far East expansion during the Allied campaigns in China-Burma-India Theater. The Royal Air Force used the airfield as the site for the No. 517 AMES (Air Ministry Experimental Station), and also used by the Field Signals Unit. It also functioned as a staging post for Dakota (C-47) and Liberator (B-24) transport aircraft operating between India, Burma, and China, mainly for servicing, refuel, and maintenance operations.

Additionally, there was a Primary Training School constructed at the airfield. The RAF Training Mission China was held there under the leadership of Vice-Marshal Lawrence A Pattinson, where Chinese officers were trained according to British Staff College requirements. Chinese officers received lectures modeled after the curriculum of the RAF Staff College. They were also trained to fly the Mosquito, however RAF officers were pessimistic about ever making good flyers out of the students. The No. 5 Middle East Torpedo School, based in Shallufa, Egypt, trained several Chinese aircrew despite the limited use of torpedo bombers in the Chinese Air Force.

During Mid World War II, Chinese and British forces mainly fought in Burma to repel the Japanese advance, while American and Chinese fighter pilots protected the route in the Himalayas (known as “The Hump”).

=== Post-War ===
In 1949, many Chinese officers escaped to Taiwan, when the Communist Party took control of mainland China, while some stayed to help rebuild the Chinese Air Force, possibly transferring their knowledge from the RAF.

== See also ==
- List of former Royal Air Force stations
