= Mainstream Baptists =

American Christian organization

Mainstream Baptists is a network of Baptists in fourteen U.S. states that have organized to advocate historic Baptist principles, particularly the separation of church and state, and to oppose Fundamentalism and Theocratic Calvinism within the Southern Baptist Convention. As such, it is not a denomination, but rather an organization that provides resources, support, and interagency communication.

== Beliefs ==
=== Lordship of Christ ===
- The heart of Baptist beliefs is the Lordship of Christ.
- Christ is Lord over the individual believer, he is Lord over the church, and he is Lord over the universe and all that is in it.
- Jesus Christ is the final authority in our individual lives, in our homes, in our churches, and in all our relationships with society and the world.
- Our ultimate loyalty and allegiance is to God's Person, rather than to books, creeds, confessions, traditions, programs or procedures.

=== Salvation by Grace Through Faith ===
- "For by grace have you been saved through faith; and that not of yourselves, it is the gift of God; not as a result of works, that no one should boast".
- Baptists believe that God's love and grace is the only basis for any person's relationship with God. The individual can do nothing to earn or deserve God's love and forgiveness. Faith is not an effort or labor.
- Faith is receiving God's love with an open heart and finding it transformed by God's grace.

=== Believer's Baptism ===
- Baptists baptize persons only after they make a personal confession of their faith in Christ.
- Baptists do not believe that a loving God condemns anyone for a sin they did not commit. Baptists do not view baptism as a remedy for original sin. Baptists do not baptize infants.
- Baptists practice baptism by totally immersing persons in water, rather than by sprinkling, pouring, or anointing persons with water.
- Baptism by immersion preserves the dramatic imagery of the meaning of baptism as a symbolic death, burial and resurrection. The symbolism of baptism pictures: the death, burial and resurrection of Christ who died for our sins and the believer's own death to sin, burial of a sinful nature, and resurrection to a new life in Christ.

=== Priesthood of All Believers and Liberty of Conscience ===
- Baptists believe that all members are equal under God in the fellowship of the church. Jesus is the one mediator between God and humanity. Every human being has direct access to God through Christ.
- Every Christian is her or his own priest in that he or she is authorized to go directly to God for forgiveness of sins and to search the scriptures with confidence of being guided by the same Spirit that inspired those who wrote the Bible.
- Every Christian is a priest to others in that he or she is a member of a royal priesthood and responsible to Christ for ministering to others.

=== Religious Liberty and the Separation of Church and State ===
- "Religious Liberty is the nursing mother of all liberty. Without it all other forms of liberty must soon wither and die. The Baptists grasped this conception of liberty in its full-orbed glory, from the very beginning. Their contention has been, is now, and must ever be, that it is the God-given and indefeasible right of every human being, to worship God or not, according to the dictates of his conscience; and, as long as he does not infringe on the rights of others, he is to be held accountable to God alone, for all his religious beliefs and practices." —George W. Truett

=== Mainstream Baptists and the Bible ===
- The Bible from a Mainstream Perspective. No human understanding of the Bible can be so exhaustive and authoritative as to merit use as an “instrument of doctrinal accountability.” Mainstream Baptists think it more prudent to leave every believer free to interpret the Bible according to the dictates of a conscience that is guided by the Holy Spirit.
- Though Mainstream Baptists insist on thinking for themselves, there is a broad consensus among them concerning the scriptures.
- Mainstream Baptists love and respect the Bible. It is a holy book in that it holds a separate and unique place. It is the story of God's love. Each of us is part of that story. By identifying with this story, our lives receive meaning and direction.
- While Baptists love and respect the Bible, they do not worship it. The Bible is the written word of God. In and of itself it is paper and ink, words and sentences, and has no life. The Bible is not the supreme revelation of God—It points to and must be fulfilled and completed by God's Living Word, Jesus Christ. As the only mediator between God and a person, he gives scriptures life by creating from them a spark of understanding in the individual. From that understanding He calls us to a personal relationship with Him. Those who respond in faith to God's call, identify with His story and commit themselves to a life of discipleship. For them, the Bible becomes more than a reliable record of God's revelation in the past. It is the authoritative tradition from which we view the horizons of life in both time and eternity.
- Baptists believe in the divine inspiration and human authorship of the Bible.

=== Congregational Autonomy ===
- Mainstream Baptists believe in congregational autonomy which means that every local congregation is under the direct Lordship of Christ. They are opposed to ecclesiastical hierarchies. Their churches are not subordinate to the rule of any denomination, convention, association, fellowship or any other religious body. They believe that Christ is in and is the head of every congregation of his people.
- Their churches operate democratically because they believe every other form of church government infringes on the Lordship of Christ. Every member is responsible for seeking and following the guidance of the Holy Spirit as they participate in the deliberations and work of the church. Each member has equal right to voice their convictions and to vote according to their conscience when the congregation makes decisions. They trust the spiritual discernment of the majority and act on it. They also realize that majorities can be mistaken and act with respect toward the consciences of a sometimes-prophetic minority.

=== Cooperative missions ===
- Mainstream Baptists are committed to extending the good news about what God has done in Christ to all the world. They believe that every Christian is a missionary.
- They believe that calls some persons to devote their lives to special ministries. Recognizing that the needs of the world are great, they cooperate and partner with other Christians and churches to support vocational missionaries with their prayers, their encouragement, their labors, and their financial assistance.
