= Memorial bench =

Seat commemorating a person

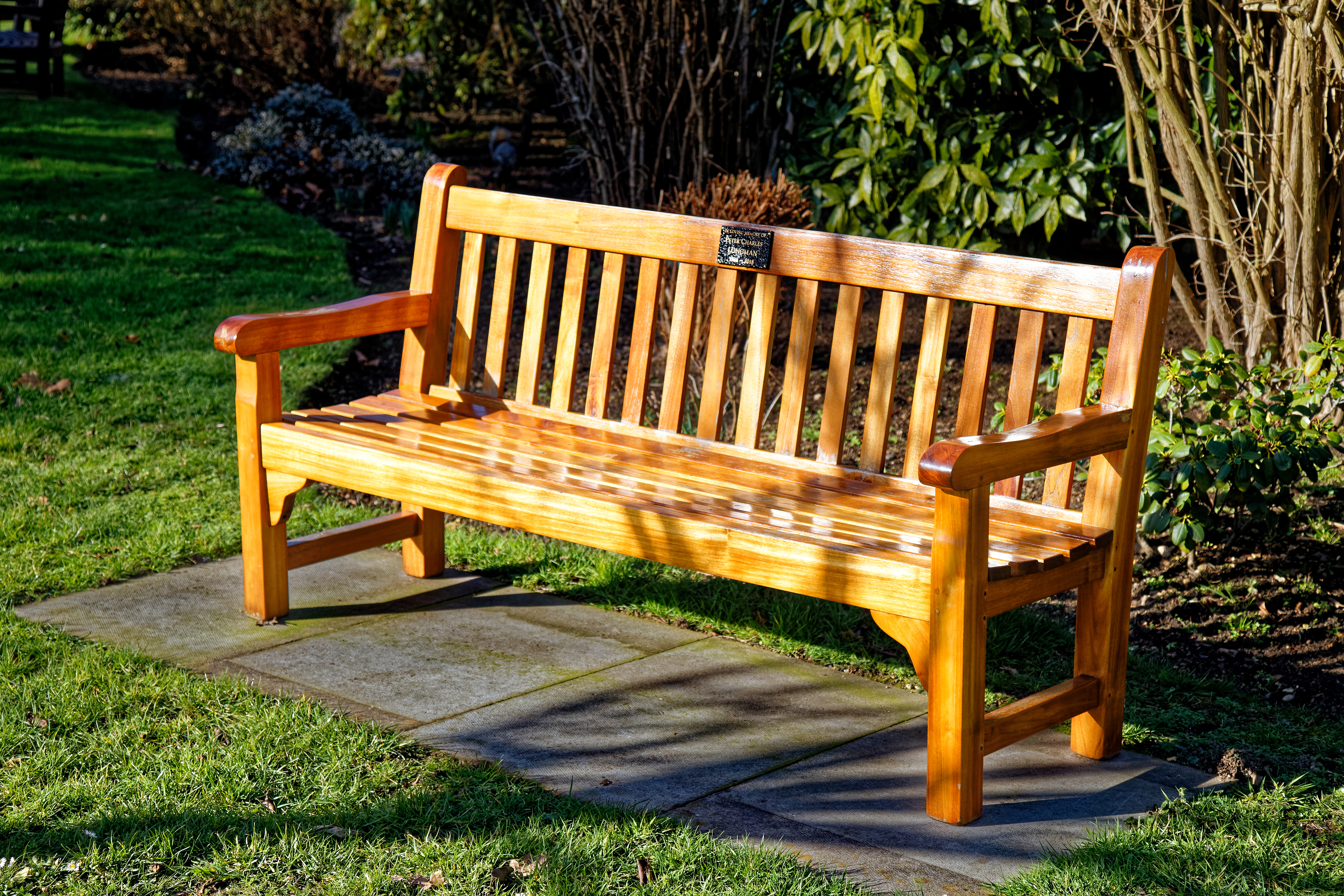
Memorial bench with plaque ("In loving memory of Peter Charles Longman, 1946-2018") in the City of London

A memorial bench, memorial seat or death bench is a piece of outdoor furniture which commemorates a deceased person. Such benches are typically made of wood, but can also be made of metal, stone, or synthetic materials such as plastics. Typically memorial benches are placed in public places.

In heritage sites, memorial benches are often placed outside of the protected area of a cemetery or other religious site, where it is not feasible to install them, due to the red tape and heritage status.

== See also ==
- Commemorative plaque
