= Margaret Lloyd George =

Welsh humanitarian (1864–1941)

Dame Margaret Lloyd George GBE JP
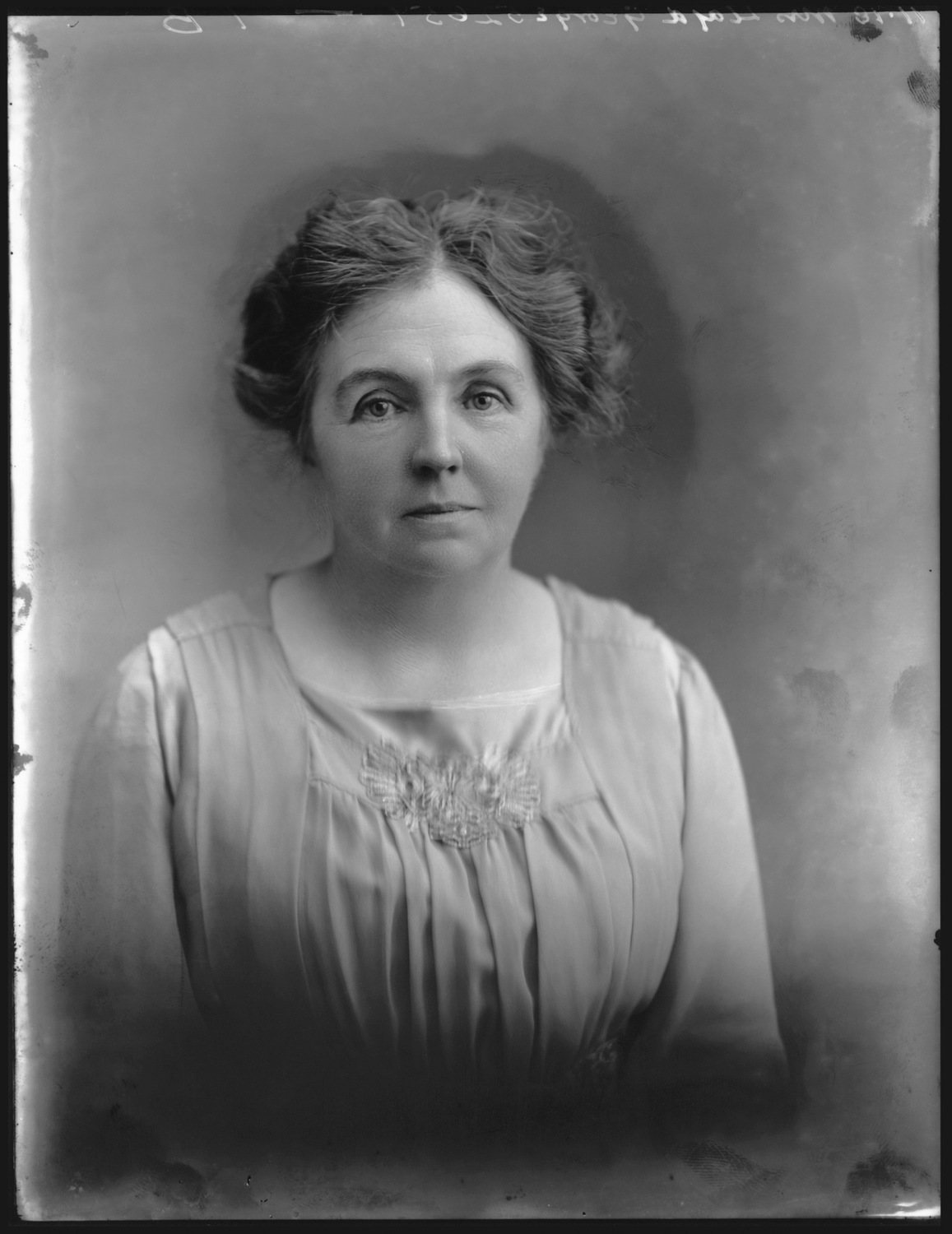
- Lloyd George in 1918
- Born: Margaret Owen; 4 November 1864
- Died: 20 January 1941 (aged 76); Criccieth, Wales
- Resting place: Criccieth Burial Ground
- Education: Dr Williams' School for Girls
- Known for: Spouse of the prime minister of the United Kingdom (1916–1922)
- Political party: Liberal
- Spouse: David Lloyd George (m. 1888)
- Children: 5; including Richard, Olwen, Gwilym and Megan

Dame Margaret Lloyd George GBE JP (née Owen; 4 November 1864 – 20 January 1941) was a Welsh humanitarian and one of the first seven women magistrates appointed in Britain in 1919. She was the wife of Prime Minister David Lloyd George from 1888 until her death in 1941.

== Early life ==
Margaret Owen was born on 4 November 1864 to Richard Owen, an elder of Capel Mawr of Criccieth, Caernarfonshire, a well-to-do Methodist farmer and valuer. She was educated at Dr Williams' School for Girls, Dolgellau.

== Marriage and children ==
On 24 January 1888, Owen married David Lloyd George while he was a solicitor in Porthmadog. Her father initially disapproved of him. They had five children:

- Richard, later 2nd Earl Lloyd-George of Dwyfor (1889–1968), who wrote a biography of Lloyd George: Dame Margaret: The Life Story of His Mother.
- Mair Eluned (1890–1907)
- Lady Olwen Elizabeth Carey Evans, DBE (3 April 1892 – 2 March 1990); she married Major Thomas John Carey Evans in 1917 at London's Welsh Baptist Chapel. She was the grandmother of Margaret MacMillan and great-grandmother of television presenter Dan Snow.
- Gwilym, later 1st Viscount Tenby (1894–1967)
- Lady Megan Lloyd George, CH (1902–1966), the first female Member of Parliament (MP) for a Welsh constituency

== Political activity and public service ==
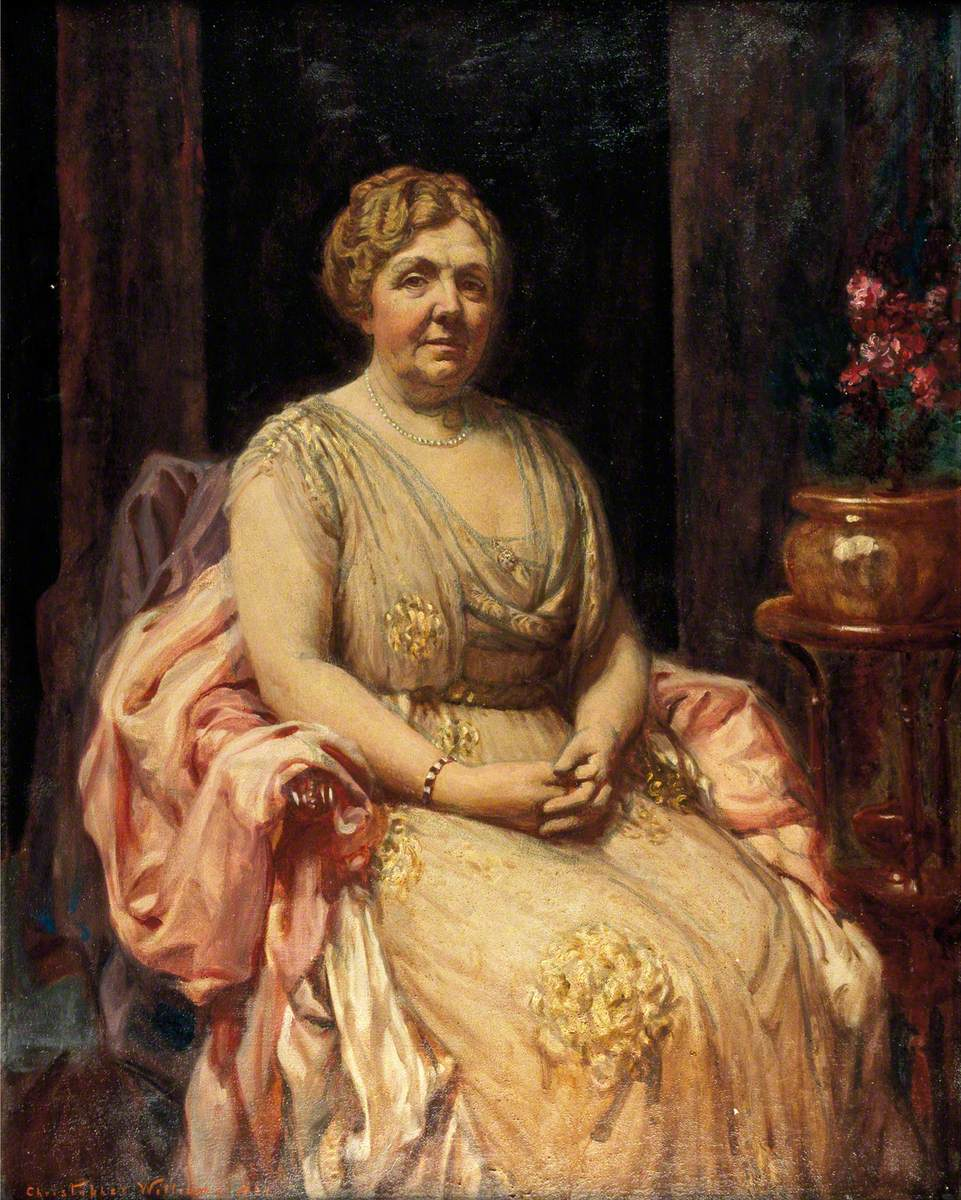
Portrait of Dame Margaret Lloyd George, 1921 by Christopher Williams

In 1918, during her husband's premiership, Lloyd George was appointed Dame Grand Cross of the Order of the British Empire (GBE) after raising over £200,000 for war charities.

On 24 December 1919, the day after the Sex Disqualification (Removal) Act 1919 received Royal Assent, Lloyd George was one of the first seven women to be appointed as a Magistrate, alongside Lady Crewe, Lady Londonderry, Elizabeth Haldane, Gertrude Tuckwell, Beatrice Webb and Mary Augusta Ward. She was the first Welsh woman to hold this office.

On 8 December 1920, Margaret Lloyd George visited Leeds and stayed with Lady Airedale, whose home was nearby. Baroness Airedale "expressed her great pleasure at the presence of Dame Margaret Lloyd George at the very successful reception at Leeds, to which over 150 prominent ladies of Coalition Liberal sympathies were invited from all parts of Yorkshire".

Margaret Lloyd George had earlier presided over a meeting on 21 October 1920 at which the Young Wales Association was founded. This meeting, at the Portman Rooms, Baker Street, was attended by over 400 members of the London Welsh community. Margaret Lloyd George subsequently became its President (1921–22). The Young Wales Association, which afterwards became the London Welsh Trust, runs the London Welsh Centre on Gray's Inn Road, London, which she opened on 29 November 1930.

She served on Criccieth Urban District Council from 1919 until her death, including three years as its chairman, was the first female Justice of the Peace in Caernarfonshire, and was president of the Women's Liberal Federation of North and South Wales.

== Death ==
She died at her home in Criccieth, Wales on 20 January 1941 after a period of illness following a fall when she injured her hip.
