= PEN Hessell-Tiltman Prize =

Award

The PEN Hessell-Tiltman Prize was awarded to the best work of non-fiction of historical content covering a period up to and including World War II, and published in the year of the award. The books are to be of high literary merit, but not primarily academic. The prize is organized by the English PEN. Marjorie Hessell-Tiltman was a member of PEN during the 1960s and 1970s; on her death in 1999 she bequeathed £100,000 to the PEN Literary Foundation to found a prize in her name. Each year's winner receives £2,000.

The prize concluded in 2026 with a special "Winner of Winners" award.

The award was one of many PEN awards sponsored by PEN International affiliates in over 145 PEN centres around the world.

== Winners and shortlist ==
A blue ribbon denotes the winner.

=== 2000s ===
==== 2002 ====
- Margaret MacMillan, Peacemakers: The Paris Peace Conference of 1919 and Its Attempt to End War

==== 2003 ====
- William Dalrymple, White Mughals: Love and Betrayal in 18th Century India
- Geoffrey Moorhouse, The Pilgrimage of Grace: The Rebellion That Shook Henry VIII's Throne
- Munro Price, The Fall of the French Monarchy: Louis XVI, Marie Antoinette and the Baron de Breteuil
- Jenny Uglow, The Lunar Men: The Friends Who Made the Future 1730–1810
- A.N. Wilson, The Victorians

==== 2004 ====
- James Buchan, Capital of the Mind: How Edinburgh Changed the World
- Norman Davies, Rising '44: The Battle for Warsaw
- Richard A. Fletcher, The Cross and the Crescent: The Dramatic Story of the Earliest Encounters Between Christians and Muslims
- Tom Holland, Rubicon: The Last Years of the Roman Republic
- Diarmaid MacCulloch, Reformation: Europe's House Divided 1490–1700

==== 2005 ====
- Joachim Fest, Inside Hitler's Bunker: The Last Days of the Third Reich
- Paul Fussell, The Boys' Crusade: The American Infantry in Northwestern Europe, 1944–1945 (joint winners)
- Mark Mazower, Salonica, City of Ghosts: Christians, Muslims and Jews, 1430–1950
- Richard Overy, The Dictators: Hitler's Germany, Stalin's Russia (joint winners)
- Jonathan Phillips, The Fourth Crusade and the Sack of Constantinople

==== 2006 ====
- Charles Townshend, Easter 1916: The Irish Rebellion
- Simon Schama, Rough Crossings: Britain, the Slaves and the American Revolution
- Bryan Ward-Perkins, The Fall of Rome and the End of Civilization

==== 2007 ====
- Jerry Brotton, The Sale of the Late King's Goods: Charles I and His Art Collection
- Deborah Cohen, Household Gods: The British and Their Possessions
- William Dalrymple, The Last Mughal: The Fall of a Dynasty, Delhi 1857
- J. H. Elliott, Empires of the Atlantic World – Britain and Spain in America, 1492–1830
- Vic Gatrell, City of Laughter: Sex and Satire in Eighteenth-Century London
- Adam Tooze, The Wages of Destruction: The Making and Breaking of the Nazi Economy

==== 2008 ====
- Philipp Blom, The Vertigo Years: Change and Culture in the West 1900–1914
- Leo Hollis, The Phoenix: St Paul's Cathedral and the Men Who Made Modern London
- Mark Mazower, Hitler's Empire: Nazi Rule in Occupied Europe
- Frederick Spotts, The Shameful Peace: How French Artists and Intellectuals Survived the Nazi Occupation
- Clair Wills, That Neutral Island: A cultural history of Ireland during the Second World War

==== 2009 ====
- Mark Thompson, The White War: Life & Death on the Italian Front 1915–1919

=== 2010s ===
==== 2010 ====
- Dominic Lieven, Russia Against Napoleon: The Battle for Europe, 1807 to 1814
- Diarmaid MacCulloch, A History of Christianity: The First Three Thousand Years
- Amanda Vickery, Behind Closed Doors: at Home in Georgian London

==== 2011 ====
- Amanda Foreman, A World on Fire: an Epic History of Two Nations Divided
- Philip Mansel, Levant: Splendour and Catastrophe in the Mediterranean
- Roger Moorhouse, Berlin at War: Life and Death in Hitler's Capital 1939–1945
- Toby Wilkinson, The Rise and Fall of Ancient Egypt: the History of a Civilisation from 3000 BC to Cleopatra

==== 2012 ====
- Lizzie Collingham, The Taste of War: World War II and the Battle for Food
- Norman Davies, Vanished Kingdoms: The History of Half-Forgotten Europe
- David Edgerton, Britain's War Machine: Weapons, Resources and Experts in the Second World War
- James Gleick, The Information: A History, a Theory, a Flood
- Edward J. Larson, An Empire of Ice: Scott, Shackleton, and the Heroic Age of Antarctic Science
- Adam Hochschild, To End All Wars: A Story of Loyalty and Rebellion, 1914–1918

==== 2013 ====
- Jerry Brotton, A History of the World in Twelve Maps
- Chris Clark, The Sleepwalkers: How Europe Went to War in 1914
- Nigel Cliff, The Last Crusade: The Epic Voyages of Vasco da Gama
- Jonathan Dimbleby, Destiny in the Desert: The Road to El Alamein
- Keith Lowe, Savage Continent: Europe in the Aftermath of World War II
- Mark Mazower, Governing the World: The History of an Idea

==== 2014 ====
- David Crane, Empires of the Dead: How One Man's Vision Led to the Creation of WWI's World Graves
- William Dalrymple, Return of a King: The Battle for Afghanistan
- Vic Gatrell, The First Bohemians: Life and Art in London's Golden Age
- Charlotte Higgins, Under Another Sky: Journeys in Roman Britain
- David Reynolds, The Long Shadow: The Great War and the Twentieth Century
- Carl Watkins, The Undiscovered Country: Journeys Among the Dead

==== 2015 ====
- Mark Bostridge, The Fateful Year: England 1914
- Jessie Childs, God's Traitors: Terror and Faith in Elizabethan England
- Ronald Hutton, Pagan Britain
- Robert Tombs, The English and Their History
- Jenny Uglow, In These Times: Living in Britain Through Napoleon's Wars

==== 2016 ====
- Mary Beard, SPQR: A History of Ancient Rome
- Peter Frankopan, The Silk Roads: A New History of the World
- Sarah Helm, If This Is a Woman – Inside Ravensbruck: Hitler's Concentration Camp for Women
- Raghu Karnad, The Farthest Field: An Indian Story of the Second World War
- James S. Shapiro, 1606: William Shakespeare and the Year of Lear
- Nicholas Stargardt, The German War: A Nation Under Arms, 1939–1945

==== 2017 ====
The shortlist was announced 7 June 2017. The winner was announced 10 July.

- Sarah Bakewell, At the Existentialist Café: Freedom, Being, and Apricot Cocktails
- Jerry Brotton, This Orient Isle: Elizabethan England and the Islamic World
- Susan L. Carruthers, The Good Occupation: American Soldiers and the Hazards of Peace
- Dan Cruickshank, Spitalfields: The History of a Nation in a Handful of Streets
- Frank Dikötter, The Cultural Revolution: A People's History, 1962–1976
- David Olusoga, Black and British: A Forgotten History
- Tim Whitmarsh, Battling the Gods: Atheism in the Ancient World

==== 2018 ====
The shortlist was announced 22 March 2018. The winner was announced 24 June 2018.

- Stephen Alford, London's Triumph: Merchant Adventurers and the Tudor City
- Anne Applebaum, Red Famine: Stalin's War on Ukraine
- Masha Gessen, The Future Is History: How Totalitarianism Reclaimed Russia
- Christopher J. Lebron, The Making of Black Lives Matter: A Brief History of an Idea
- Lynda Nead, The Tiger in the Smoke: Art and Culture in Post-War Britain
- S. A. Smith, Russia in Revolution: An Empire in Crisis, 1890–1928

==== 2019 ====
The winner was announced 4 December 2019.

- Edward Wilson-Lee, The Catalogue of Shipwrecked Books: Young Columbus and the Quest for a Universal Library

=== 2020s ===
==== 2020 ====
The shortlist was announced on 29 October 2020. The winner was announced on 1 December 2020.

- Anita Anand, The Patient Assassin: A True Tale of Massacre, Revenge, and the Raj
- Julia Blackburn, Time Song: Searching for Doggerland
- Hazel Carby, Imperial: A Tale of Two Islands
- Toby Green, A Fistful of Shells: West Africa from the Rise of the Slave Trade to the Age of Revolution
- Caroline Moorhead, A House in the Mountains: The Women Who Liberated Italy from Fascism
- Thomas Penn, The Brothers York: An English Tragedy
- Roel Sterckx, Chinese Thought: From Confucius to Cook Ding

==== 2021 ====
The shortlist was announced on 14 October 2021 and the winner on 7 December.

- Barbara Demick, Eat the Buddha: Life and Death in a Tibetan Town
- Chris Gosden, The History of Magic: From Alchemy to Witchcraft, from the Ice Age to the Present
- Helen McCarthy, Double Lives: A History of Working Motherhood
- Sinclair McKay, Dresden: The Fire and the Darkness
- Sujit Sivasundaram, Waves Across the South: A New History of Revolution and Empire
- Ben Wilson, Metropolis: A History of the City, Humankind's Greatest Invention
- Rebecca Wragg Sykes, Kindred: Neanderthal Life, Love, Death and Art

==== 2022 ====
The shortlist was announced on 7 October 2022.

- Rebecca Birrell, This Dark Country: Women Artists, Still Life and Intimacy in the Early Twentieth Century
- Raphael Cormack, Midnight in Cairo: The Female Stars of Egypt's Roaring '20s — honourable mention
- Amitav Ghosh, The Nutmeg's Curse: Parables for a Planet in Crisis
- Julie Kavanagh, The Irish Assassins: Conspiracy, Revenge and the Murders That Stunned an Empire
- Louis Menand, The Free World: Art and Thought in the Cold War
- Ian Sanjay Patel, We're Here Because You Were There: Immigration and the End of Empire
- Francesca Stavrakopoulou, God: An Anatomy

==== 2023 ====
The shortlist was announced on Thursday, November 2nd, 2023.

- Aviah Sarah Day and Shanice Octavia McBean, Abolition Revolution (Pluto Press)
- Anna Della Subin, Accidental Gods: On Men Unwittingly Turned Divine (Granta)
- Calum Jacobs, A New Formation: How Black Footballers Shaped the Modern Game (Merky Books)
- Philippe Sands,The Last Colony: A Tale of Exile, Justice and Britain's Colonial Legacy (Weidenfeld and Nicolson)
- Julieann Campbell,On Bloody Sunday: A New History of the Day and Its Aftermath by Those Who Were There (Monoray)
- Kojo Koram, Uncommon Wealth: Britain and the Aftermath of Empire (John Murray Press)

==== 2024 ====
The shortlist was announced on 14 November 2024.

- Caroline Dodds Pennock, On Savage Shores: How Indigenous Americans Discovered Europe (W&N)
- Robert Gildea, Backbone of the Nation: Mining Communities and the Great Strike of 1984–85 (Yale University Press)
- Katja Hoyer, Beyond the Wall: East Germany 1949–1990 (Allen Lane)
- Ian Rutledge, Sea of Troubles: The European Conquest of the Islamic Mediterranean and the Origins of the First World War (Saqi Books)
- Avi Shlaim, Three Worlds: Memoirs of an Arab-Jew (Oneworld)
- Maria Smilios, The Black Angels: The Untold Story of the Nurses Who Helped Cure Tuberculosis (Virago)

== See also ==
- List of history awards
