= Margaret MacMillan =

Canadian historian (born 1943)

Margaret MacMillan OM CC CH FRSL FRSC FBA FRCGS
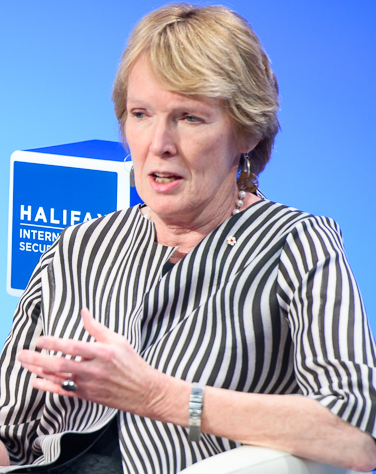
- MacMillan in 2017

Warden of St Antony's College, Oxford
- In office 2007–2017
- Preceded by: Roger Goodman (acting)
- Succeeded by: Roger Goodman

Provost of Trinity College, Toronto
- In office 2002–2007
- Chancellor: John Bothwell; Michael Wilson
- Preceded by: Thomas Delworth
- Succeeded by: Andy Orchard

Personal details
- Born: Margaret Olwen MacMillan; 23 December 1943 (age 82) Toronto, Ontario, Canada
- Education: University of Toronto (BA); St Hilda's College, Oxford (BPhil); St Antony's College, Oxford (DPhil)
- Website: margaretmacmillan.com
- Relatives: David Lloyd George (great-grandfather); Thomas Carey Evans (grandfather); Olwen Carey Evans (grandmother); Dan Snow (nephew)

Academic background
- Thesis: Social and Political Attitudes of British Expatriates in India, 1880–1920 (1974)

Academic work
- Discipline: History
- Institutions: Ryerson University; Trinity College, Toronto; St Antony's College, Oxford
- Notable works: Peacemakers: The Paris Peace Conference of 1919 and Its Attempt to End War (2001)

Margaret Olwen MacMillan (born 23 December 1943) is a Canadian historian and emeritus professor at the University of Oxford. She is former provost of Trinity College, Toronto, and professor of history at the University of Toronto and previously at Ryerson University (now Toronto Metropolitan University). MacMillan is an expert on the history of international relations.

MacMillan was the 2018 Reith lecturer, giving five lectures across the globe on the theme of war under the title The Mark of Cain, the tour taking in London, York, Beirut, Belfast, and Ottawa.

== Family ==
Margaret MacMillan was born to Dr Robert Laidlaw MacMillan and Eiluned Carey Evans on 23 December 1943. Her maternal grandfather was Major Sir Thomas J. Carey Evans of the Indian Medical Service. The senior Evans served as personal physician to Rufus Isaacs, 1st Marquess of Reading, during the latter's term as Viceroy of India (1921–26). Her maternal grandmother, Lady Olwen Carey Evans, was a daughter of David Lloyd George, Prime Minister of the United Kingdom, and his first wife, Dame Margaret Lloyd George.

British popular historian and television presenter Dan Snow is her nephew.

== Education ==
MacMillan received a Bachelor of Arts (BA) degree in history from the University of Toronto, where she attended Trinity College. She holds a Bachelor of Philosophy (BPhil) degree in politics from St Hilda's College, Oxford, and a Doctor of Philosophy (DPhil) degree from St Antony's College, Oxford. Her doctoral dissertation was on the social and political perspectives of the British in India: it was titled "Social and political attitudes of British expatriates in India, 1880–1920" and was submitted in 1974.

== Academic career ==
From 1975 to 2002, she was a professor of history at Ryerson University in Toronto, including five years as department chair. She was Provost of Trinity College, Toronto from 2002 to 2007. From 2007 to 2017, she was Warden of St Antony's College, Oxford, and Professor of International History at the University of Oxford. In December 2017, she became an honorary fellow at Lady Margaret Hall, Oxford.

She is the author of Women of the Raj. In addition to numerous articles and reviews on a variety of Canadian and world affairs, MacMillan has co-edited books dealing with Canada's international relations, including with NATO, and with Canadian–Australian relations.

From 1995 to 2003, MacMillan co-edited the International Journal, published by the Canadian Institute of International Affairs. She previously served as a member of the National Board of Directors of the CIIA, now the Canadian International Council, and currently sits on the International Journal's Editorial Board. She was the Young Memorial Visitor at Royal Military College of Canada in 2004 and delivered the J.D. Young Memorial Lecture on 24 November 2004.

MacMillan's research has focused on the British Empire in the late 19th and early 20th centuries and on international relations in the 20th century. Over the course of her career, she has taught a range of courses on the history of international relations. She is a member of the European Advisory Board of Princeton University Press.

== Recognition and honours ==
External videos
- Booknotes interview with MacMillan on Paris 1919, 29 December 2002, C-SPAN

Her most successful work is Peacemakers: The Paris Peace Conference of 1919 and Its Attempt to End War, also published as Paris 1919: Six Months That Changed the World. Peacemakers won the Duff Cooper Prize for outstanding literary work in the field of history, biography or politics; the Hessell-Tiltman Prize for History; the prestigious Samuel Johnson Prize for the best work of non-fiction published in the United Kingdom and the 2003 Governor General's Literary Award in Canada.

In Canada, MacMillan has served on the boards of Historica, the Canadian Institute for International Affairs, the Atlantic Council of Canada, the Ontario Heritage Foundation, and the Churchill Society for the Advancement of Parliamentary Democracy (Canada). She served Senior Fellow of Massey College, University of Toronto, stepping down in 2020. She has honorary degrees from the University of King's College, the Royal Military College of Canada and Ryerson University, Toronto, and Memorial University in Newfoundland and Labrador. MacMillan represented the order at the coronation of Charles III, King of Canada, and Queen Camilla on 6 May 2023.

In the United Kingdom, she is a Fellow of the Royal Society of Literature, an Honorary Fellow of St Antony's College, Oxford and the Learned Society of Wales. She is a Member of the Board of Trustees of the Imperial War Museum. In 2017, Prime Minister of the United Kingdom Theresa May advised Queen Elizabeth II to appoint MacMillan as a Member of the Order of the Companions of Honour. This was announced in the New Year honours list for 2018. She was made a member of the Order of Merit by King Charles III in 2022.

In May 2019, MacMillan received an honorary degree from the American University of Paris.

== Articles and other media ==
MacMillan often appears in the popular and literary press, with a focus on events surrounding the First World War. Examples in 2014 include her retrospective trip to Sarajevo on the centenary of the assassination of Archduke Franz Ferdinand, and interview wherein she saw similarities between then and 100 years before, remarked on the annexation of Crimea by the Russian Federation and her perception that Vladimir Putin deplored Russia's place in contemporary politics, mentioned Iraq and the contention between China and Japan over the Senkaku Islands, and promoted the diplomatic corps.

In September 2013, she was interviewed upon the release of her book The War That Ended Peace: The Road to 1914, and was invited to lecture at the Bill Graham Centre for Contemporary International History on "How Wars Start: The Outbreak of the First World War" near when she received an honorary doctorate from Huron College at the University of Western Ontario.

MacMillan has written several op-eds for The New York Times. In December 2013, they abridged an essay of hers from the Brookings Institution, in which she wrote that "Globalization can have the paradoxical effect of fostering intense localism and nativism, frightening people into taking refuge in small like-minded groups. Globalization also makes possible the widespread transmission of radical ideologies and the bringing together of fanatics who will stop at nothing in their quest for the perfect society", and urged Western leaders to "build a stable international order" based on "a moment of real danger" which would unite the population in "coalitions able and willing to act".

On the ten-year anniversary of the 11 September attacks in New York, MacMillan wrote an essay on the consequences of the attacks, in which she dismissed the power of Osama bin Laden and stressed the secular nature of the Arab Spring revolutions that deposed Hosni Mubarak and Zine El Abidine Ben Ali.

In August 2014, MacMillan was one of 200 public figures who were signatories to a letter to The Guardian opposing Scottish independence in the run-up to September's referendum on that issue.

== Bibliography ==
=== Books ===
External videos
- Q&A interview with MacMillan on Nixon and Mao, 11 March 2007, C-SPAN
- Presentation by MacMillan on The War That Ended Peace, 4 November 2013, C-SPAN
- Q&A interview with MacMillan on The War That Ended Peace, 15 December 2013, C-SPAN

- Women of the Raj. Thames and Hudson, 1988; Women of the Raj: The Mothers, Wives, and Daughters of the British Empire in India. Random House LLC. 2007. ISBN 978-0-8129-7639-7.
- Canada and NATO: Uneasy Past, Uncertain Future. Edited with David Sorenson. Waterloo, 1990.
- The Uneasy Century: International Relations 1900–1990. Kendall/Hunt, 1996.
- Parties Long Estranged: Canada and Australia in the Twentieth Century. Co-authored with Francine McKenzie. University of British Columbia, 2003.
- Peacemakers: The Paris Peace Conference of 1919 and Its Attempt to End War. John Murray 2001/2002/2003. ISBN 9780719559396
  - Paris 1919: Six Months That Changed the World. Random House Publishing Group. 18 December 2007. ISBN 978-0-307-43296-4.
- Canada's House: Rideau Hall and the Invention of a Canadian Home. Co-authored with Marjorie Harris and Anne L. Desjardins. Knopf Canada, 2004
- Nixon in China: The Week That Changed the World. Viking Canada, 2006.
  - Nixon and Mao : the week that changed the world (1st U.S. pbk ed.). Random House. 2008.
- The Uses and Abuses of History. Penguin Canada, 2008; The Uses and Abuses of History. Profile Books. 1 March 2010. ISBN 978-1-84668-210-0.
  - Dangerous Games: The Uses and Abuses of History. Random House Publishing Group. 7 July 2009. ISBN 978-1-58836-768-6.
- Stephen Leacock. Penguin Group US. 31 March 2009. ISBN 978-0-14-317521-6.
- The War That Ended Peace: How Europe Abandoned Peace for the First World War. London: Profile Books. 2013. ISBN 9781846682728.
  - Canadian edition: The War That Ended Peace: The Road To 1914. Toronto: Penguin Canada. 2013. ISBN 9780670064045.
  - U.S. edition: The War That Ended Peace: The Road To 1914. New York: Random House. 2013. ISBN 9781400068555.
- History's People: Personalities and the Past. CBC Massey Lectures. Toronto, ON: House of Anansi Press. 2015. ISBN 978-1-4870-0005-9. OCLC 913612314.
- War: How conflict shaped us (First U.S. ed.). New York: Random House. 2020. ISBN 978-1-9848-5613-5. OCLC 1158508035.

=== Critical studies and reviews of MacMillan's work ===
Nixon and Mao

- MacFarquhar, Roderick (28 June 2007). "Mission to Mao". The New York Review of Books. 54 (11): 67–71.

Academic offices
Preceded by Thomas Delworth	Provost of the University of Trinity College; 2002–2007	Succeeded by Andy Orchard
Preceded by Sir Marrack Goulding	Warden of St Antony's College, Oxford; 2007–2017	Succeeded by Roger Goodman
Preceded by Adrienne Clarkson	Massey Lecturer; 2015	Succeeded by Jennifer Welsh
Media offices
Preceded by Dame Hilary Mantel	Reith Lecturer; 2018	Succeeded by Lord Sumption
Awards
Preceded by Lord Skidelsky	Duff Cooper Prize; 2001	Succeeded by Jane Ridley
Preceded by	Hessell-Tiltman Prize; 2002	Succeeded by Jenny Uglow
Preceded by Michael Burleigh	Samuel Johnson Prize; 2002	Succeeded by T. J. Binyon
Preceded by Andrew Nikiforuk	Governor General's Award for English-language non-fiction 2003	Succeeded by Roméo Dallaire
