= God: An Anatomy =

2021 nonfiction book by Francesca Stavrakopoulou

- Author: Francesca Stavrakopoulou
- Genre: Biblical studies, anthropology
- Publisher: Picador
- Publication date: September 16, 2021
- Publication place: United Kingdom
- Media type: Print (hardcover and paperback), and audiobook
- Pages: 608
- ISBN: 978-1509867332
- OCLC: 1240413353

God: An Anatomy is a 2021 nonfiction book by Francesca Stavrakopoulou which examines the physical descriptions of God throughout Biblical texts and ancient sources. Contrary to the modern portrayal of God as an invisible, incorporeal being, Stavrakopoulou argues that early worshippers envisioned Yahweh as a physically embodied, male deity.

== Background and publication ==
The author is Professor of Hebrew Bible and Ancient Religion at the University of Exeter. An atheist, she began studying the Bible because of its cultural significance.

God: An Anatomy was published by Picador on September 16, 2021, in the UK, and Alfred A. Knopf on January 25, 2022 in the US. An audiobook, read by Stavrakopoulou, was released in 2022. The book has been translated into Greek, Italian, and Croatian.

== Synopsis ==
God: An Anatomy catalogs the anthropomorphic references to God in the Bible, returning to the original languages of the texts for accuracy; seeing the Bible as a "highly ideological and frequently unreliable portrayal of the past", it compares Biblical writing with other archaeological evidence and engages in comparative analysis with Near Eastern religions, as well as other writing on Yahweh. The book traces how the biblical God was originally depicted as having a physical body with human characteristics, appetites, and behaviors, before gradually becoming more abstract and incorporeal through centuries of theological development:

Stripping away the theological veneer of centuries of Jewish and Christian piety, this book disentangles the biblical God from his scriptural and doctrinal fetters to reveal a deity wholly unlike the God worshipped by Jews and Christians today. The God revealed in this book is the deity as his ancient worshippers saw him: a supersized, muscle-bound, good-looking god, with supra-human powers, earthly passions, and a penchant for the fantastic and the monstrous.

The book argues that the shift from viewing God as corporeal was due to the ideological interests of later scribes and theologians, as well as the influence of Ancient Greek philosophical concepts, particularly those of Platonism, which emphasized the superiority of the immaterial over the material, characterising Judaism and Christianity as "post-biblical religions [whose] disembodied deity is a later re-imagining of a god who was far from enigmatic."

Stavrakopoulou makes a case for Yahweh as a result of "pantheon reduction", instead of monotheism: That Yahweh was part of a pantheon headed by the god El who became prominent only in the first century AD, comparable and similar to other gods from the region, with similar characteristics like storm powers, warrior status, mountain dwelling, and—most significantly—intense physicality. Though different faiths evolved, the book posits that mapping God’s body, and not the Bible, can provide clearer insight into the transformation of this deity. Organised anatomically—feet and legs, genitals, torso, arms and hands, and head—the book traces how these bodily depictions reflected ancient cultural values.

== Critical reception ==
The book was shortlisted for The Wolfson History Prize in 2022. It won the PEN-Hessell Tiltman Prize that same year, judged as "revelatory and brilliant".

The New York Review of Books praised the book's scholarly depth and rigor, as well Stavrakopoulou's examination of original language texts, but said that "Stavrakopoulou's forensic approach loses the poetic beauty of the scriptures", adding that she "rejects metaphor, allegory, and any other veil of mystery through which humankind has usually encountered and described the divine. But her method has its own delights."

Karen Armstrong wrote in The New York Times that the book was "long, detailed and scrupulously researched,” its 21 chapters “packed with knowledge and insight.” Kirkus Reviews wrote: "At times, the author’s rejection of allegorical interpretations of this God is unyielding...Nonetheless, Stavrakopoulou provides a refreshing look at ancient Scripture and the people behind it," concluding the book was, "A challenging, engaging work of scholarship that sheds new light on ancient Hebrew conceptions of the divine."

In The Church Times, reviewer Katherine Southwood found Stavrakopoulou's argumentation "intellectually penetrating, analytically robust, and sophisticated". In Catholic Herald, Jack Miles wrote, "Boldly simple in concept, God: An Anatomy is stunning in its execution. It is a tour de force, a triumph, and I write this as one who disagrees with Stavrakopoulou on broad theoretical grounds and finds himself engaged with her in one narrow textual spat after another." Miles's review was printed in the Los Angeles Review of Books.

Publishers Weekly said, "By placing Hebrew stories in their local context, she explains what body parts meant to the original writers of the Bible...Stavrakopoulou writes with the fluidity of a seasoned storyteller, using ample footnotes, but never getting weighed down by academic jargon. This is a provocative tour de force."

The scholar Carole Hillenbrand said, "It is a thought-provoking book and cannot fail to spark controversy."

The book was listed among The Economist's best books of 2021. The Times also listed it as one of the books of the year. BBC Radio 4 picked it for Book of the Week, serialising it in abridged form.
