= Accidental Gods =

2021 non-fiction book by Anna Della Subin

Accidental Gods: On Men Unwittingly Turned Divine
- Front cover
- Author: Anna Della Subin
- Language: English
- Subject: Apotheosis
- Publisher: Metropolitan Books
- Publication date: 2021
- Publication place: United States
- Media type: Print, e-book
- Pages: 480 pages
- ISBN: 978-1-250-29687-0

Accidental Gods: On Men Unwittingly Turned Divine is a 2021 non-fiction book by Anna Della Subin. The book examines times during the past centuries when individuals have become deified, or regarded and treated as gods. By studying the cultural circumstances surrounding these instances, Subin seeks to understand why they occurred and what benefits they provided to both the worshipped and the worshippers. She also draws parallels between the historical events and the modern political and religious climate, including the intertwined natures of race and political power.

The book, which was shortlisted for the PEN Hessell-Tiltman Prize, received mixed reviews from critics, with a review in The New York Times calling it "an irreverent bible in its own right, a sort of celestial thought experiment", while The Guardian's reviewer believed that its "overarching thesis doesn't quite impress".

== Background ==
Prior to publishing Accidental Gods, Subin, a recipient of a master's degree from Harvard Divinity School, had been working as an essayist and independent researcher. She had previously released the book-length essay Not Dead But Sleeping and covered the Arab Spring as a contributing editor for the arts and culture magazine Bidoun. Subin had written roughly a third of the Accidental Gods manuscript without a particular proposal in mind; she had planned to finish the book before shopping it to publishers, but became discouraged and began to worry that no one would be interested in buying the work. After receiving encouragement from friends, she employed an agent who assisted her over the course of an eight-month proposal drafting process. Subin jokingly referred to the book as "dad non-fiction" and used the concept of a hypothetical "reasonable, centrist dad" reader as a way to write with a broad audience in mind.

== Synopsis ==
Accidental Gods is a study on instances of apotheosis, or the treatment of humans as divine beings, over the centuries preceding the book's publishing. Subin examines the situations when these men were deified and attempts to explain why the "accidental god haunts modernity". The book does not move chronologically, but rather is separated into three parts: one focused on the 20th century, one primarily dealing with India and the British Empire, and one on the Age of Discovery. Subin attempts to provide historical context for the situations she studies in order to properly understand why events occurred as they did, as opposed to much of the previous research that simply assumed an "inherent backwardness" on the part of the worshippers. She notes how the philologist Max Müller, for instance, based many of this theories regarding world religion on reports of the deification of colonists in India, despite never once traveling to that nation.

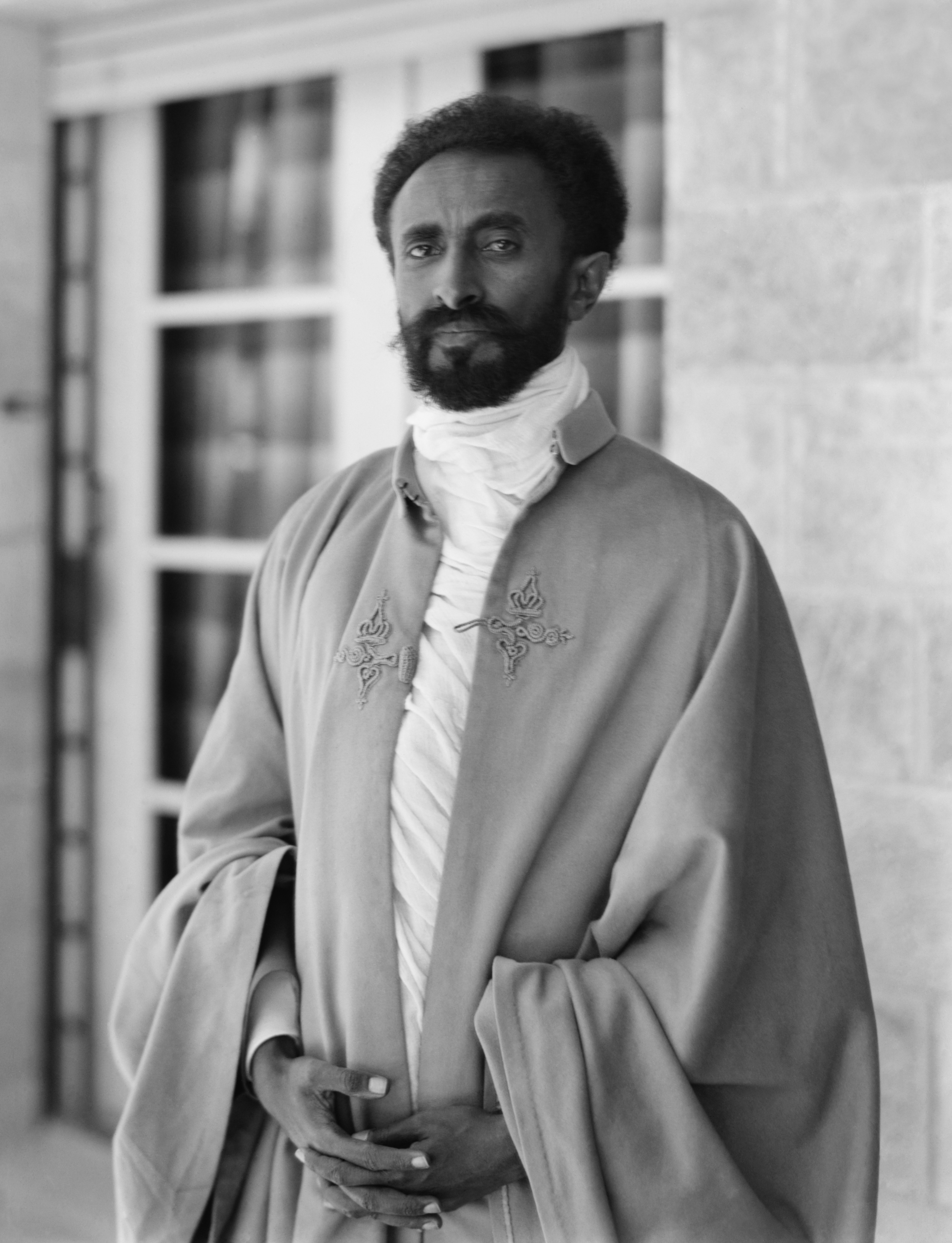
Haile Selassie I of Ethiopia

The first instance of deification that Subin analyzes is that of the Ethiopian emperor Haile Selassie. Residents of Jamaica had for some time been prophesizing the emergence of a Black deity from Ethiopia, the only nation in Africa that by that point had not been colonized. Jamaicans had become enraptured by a biography on Selassie that had appeared in an issue of National Geographic, exalting the emperor as the latest member of a lineage that went back to King Solomon and the Queen of Sheba. Subin writes that "by the 1950s, men in Kingston were preaching with the Bible in one hand and a copy of National Geographic in the other". Selassie's own attempts at dissuading his followers were unsuccessful; the Rastafarians (as they became known) concluded that since the Bible teaches "He that humbleth himself shall be exalted", then their god would naturally deny his own divinity. This deification of Selassie did ultimately benefit Jamaicans, Subin writes. Michael Manley, a politician who courted Rastafarian voters (and who carried a scepter given to him by Selassie), was elected by a wide margin to the office of prime minister in 1972. Manley eventually implemented numerous progressive policies and worked as a "democratizing force" in post-colonial Jamaica.

Other 20th century acts of apotheosis that Subin covers include that of Prince Philip and General Douglas MacArthur. The former found himself the object of worship by inhabitants of the island of Tanna; in an example of "mutual mythmaking", the British government encouraged such adulation, even going so far as to send autographed portraits to the prince's acolytes. MacArthur, meanwhile, became revered in four separate nations during and following his World War II military campaigns. One such location was Japan, despite MacArthur having previously called for Emperor Hirohito – who had also been deified by his subjects – to reject Hirohito's own apotheosis. Subin points out the irony of a military general being raised to divine status: "General MacArthur was American destruction incarnate, and he was four ways of imagining the earth renewed."

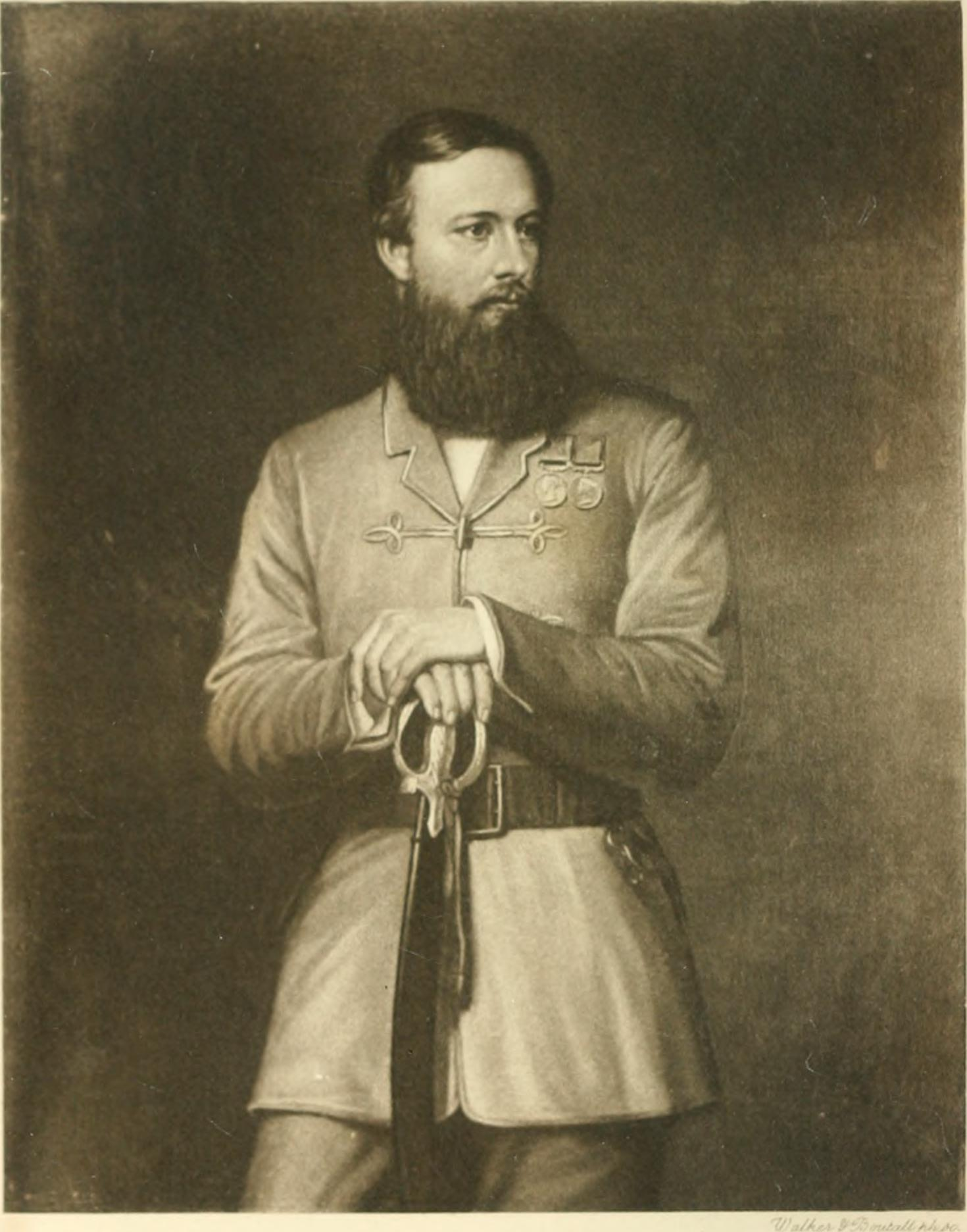
John Nicholson in uniform

The book's second section focuses on India during its time as a British colony. One case study that Subin examines is the circumstances of a 19th-century Protestant Irish man named John Nicholson, an army officer who held the people of South Asia in contempt due to his time as a prisoner of war in Kabul and his discovery of his brother's tortured body in the Khyber Pass. As Nicholson rose in the military ranks he became known as a brutally violent man – he used a severed head as an office decoration – yet he gained acolytes among the Sikh and Hindu peoples who believed him to be the reincarnation of one of Muhammad's grandsons. These acolytes followed Nicholson around constantly, despite his regular orders for them to be whipped for doing so. This cult of "Nikal Seyn" persisted after Nicholson's death and into the 20th century, and thrived, Subin argues, because the native people chose to take Nicholson's power into their own hands rather than be cowed by the officer and the colonial masters he represented. "By partaking in his divinity," she writes, "they were no longer simply creatures, but creators of fear."

The final section of the book explores instances of deification during the Age of Discovery. Subin describes how explorers like Christopher Columbus, Hernán Cortés, and Francisco Pizarro were seen as "white gods" – or how they convinced themselves they were seen that way. Columbus, for instance, was perpetually "certain...that speech in languages he could not understand proclaimed his godliness". She also recounts the story of Captain James Cook, who arrived in Hawaii while its inhabitants were celebrating the holiday of Makahiki. Cook was supposedly mistaken for the god Lono, who legend held would travel from a faraway land to rule over the Hawaiian people. Cook overstayed his welcome, however, leading to his gruesome death at the hands of the natives – a death, some Christians said at the time, that was a divine punishment for Cook's acceptance of his deification. Subin questions aspects of the story, however, including the "convenient" and self-mythologizing narrative held by the British that the ignorant Hawaiians would naturally worship the fair-skinned Cook. "To this day," she writes, "the myth that Hawaiians passively accepted the loss of their nation, without resistance, lives on."

== Analysis ==
In The New York Times, Jennifer Szalai noted a pattern in the various instances of apotheosis in Accidental Gods. She wrote that Subin found the act of deification to have a duality: it was used as a means of oppression by colonizers, yet had the potential to be an "act of subversion" that granted a measure of freedom to the oppressed. Writing for The New York Review of Books, Fara Dabhoiwala noted that by using historical events as a reference, Subin is able to draw parallels to modern approaches of disdaining what is considered primitive in order to justify colonialism and racism. The Times Literary Supplement's A.N. Wilson, too, noted Subin's deft handling of historical recurrence, as with the current inhabitants of the island of Tanna now facing a new imperialist threat in the form of climate change.

Simon Ings took note in The Telegraph of how intertwined politics and religion are in these instances of apotheosis. He wrote that by focusing her narrative more on the colonizers than the colonized, Subin is able to shine a light on how the reductive view of native religions held by many European academics was ultimately a destructive force, as in the partition of India along imagined religious boundaries. Alternatively, Molly Worthen wondered in The Washington Post if viewing these historical instances through the lens of race and political power is itself reductive. That framework for interpreting why these deifications occurred, she wrote, does not explain the existence of the cult of Nikal Seyn, for instance.

== Reception ==
Accidental Gods was short-listed for the PEN Hessell-Tiltman Prize.

In his review for The New York Review of Books, Fara Dabhoiwala praised Subin's ability to create an entertaining read out of her weighty subject matter, saying, "Though Accidental Gods wears its learning lightly and is tremendous fun to read, it also includes a series of lyrical and thought-provoking meditations on the largest of themes." Jennifer Szalai of The New York Times was impressed with the multitude of interesting details included in the text while admitting that it "meanders at times". Claire Messud, the reviewer for Harper's Magazine, appreciated the vast range of disparate information that Subin analyzes while avoiding the pitfalls of "condescending anthropological interest".

Writing for The New Yorker, Casey Cep called the book and its biographical sketches in particular "fascinating". The New Republic called Subin's voice "stylish" and "playful" and praised her ability to draw connections from her deified subjects to modern conversations of race and "anti-colonial resistance". The Spectator's reviewer, meanwhile, felt that Subin uses the blanket term of "empire" too generally throughout the book, when many of the peoples she analyzes lived under very different ruling classes.

The reviewer for The Guardian was more critical, believing that Subin's "overarching thesis doesn't quite impress" and that she is overeager to interpret certain behaviors by subjugated peoples as being "anti-imperial". They acknowledge, however, that the author is persuasive in other areas, such as in describing how readily the British Empire accepted the idea of "white divinity". The Sunday Independent found much of the material "absorbing" and containing "staggering scholarship", but felt that the disparate chapters lacked connective tissue tying them together, resulting in an "exhausting read".
