= Vic Gatrell =

British historian

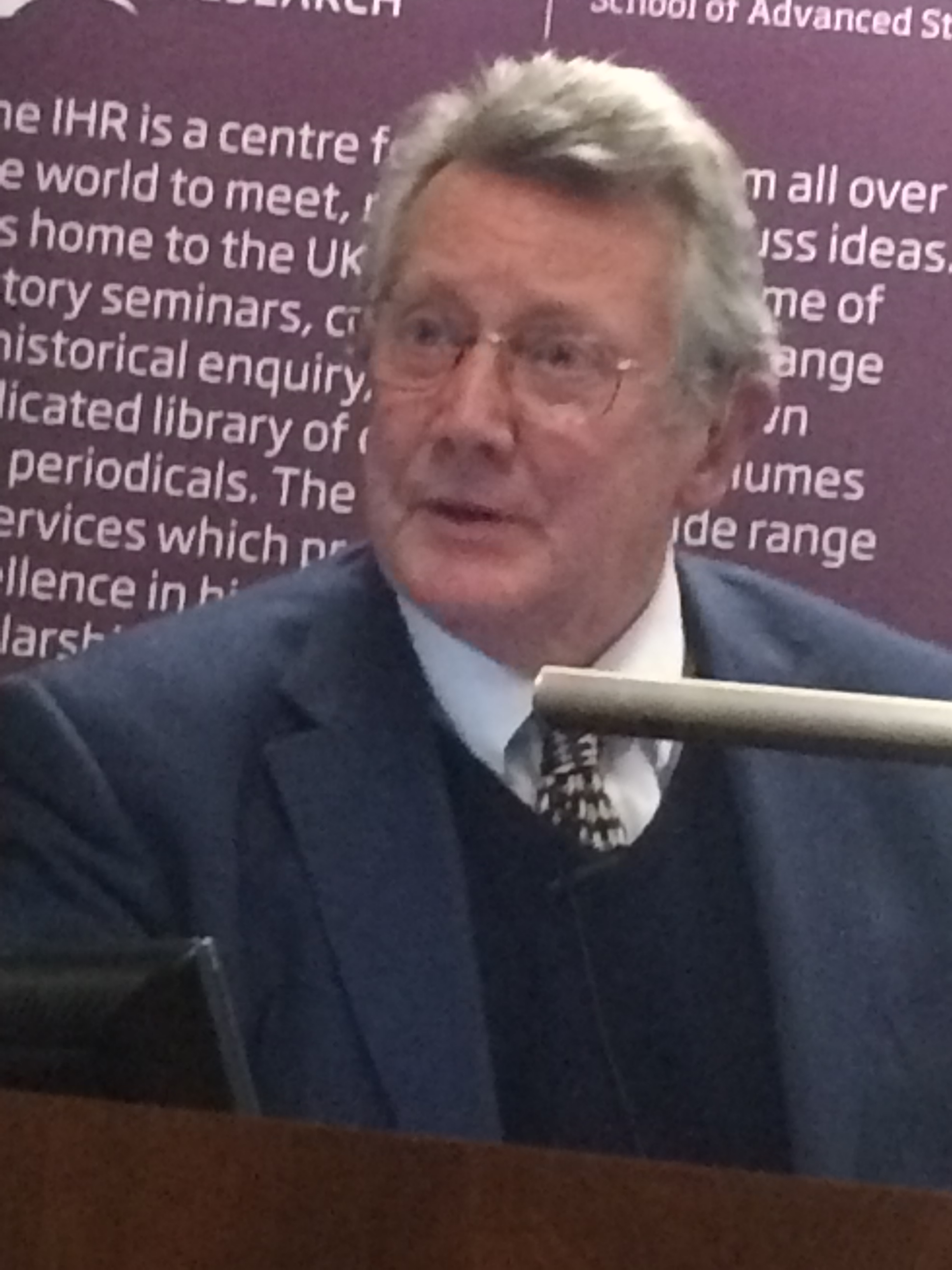
Vic Gatrell at the IHR London February 2016

Vic Gatrell, known professionally as V. A. C. Gatrell, is a prize-winning British historian. He is a Life Fellow of Gonville and Caius College, Cambridge.

== Life ==
Born to working-class immigrant Londoners in South Africa, Gatrell went to state schools in Pietermaritzburg and Port Elizabeth and then to Rhodes University, where he graduated with first-class honours and won an Elsie Ballot scholarship to St John's College, Cambridge, where he took further first-class honours in part II of the history tripos and completed his Ph.D. on 'The Commercial Middle Class in Manchester 1820–1857'.

After finishing his PhD, Gatrell stayed in Cambridge to become a research fellow and later a teaching fellow and tutor at Gonville and Caius College. At the same time he became a lecturer and then Reader in British social and economic history in the University of Cambridge History Faculty. He co-edited The Historical Journal from 1976 to 1986. He became Professor of British History at the University of Essex from 2003 to 2009, but then returned to Cambridge as a professorial Life Fellow of Caius: he and his wife have lived there since 1970.

His autobiography explains that in Cambridge his lectures and writing 'bypassed the kings, aristocrats, bishop and captains of industry and empire that fascinated most of my Faculty colleagues'. Instead, he found himself 'turning into a historian of the common people.' Gatrell is among the pioneer scholars who have worked on the eighteenth- and nineteenth-century histories of crime, punishment and emotions, and the histories of 'impolite' art and visual satire.

== Main Works ==
His The Hanging Tree: Execution and the English People 1770-1868 (Oxford, 1994) won the Royal Historical Society's Whitfield Prize, and was nominated as one of the Historical Canon in the Times Higher Education Supplement, 2010. It is a seminal study of changing attitudes to and emotions about capital punishment across a period of profound cultural change, and is still in print.

His City of Laughter: Sex and Satire in Eighteenth-century London (Atlantic, 2006) is a study of satirical caricature and manners from 1780 to 1830. It was joint winner of Britain's premier history prize, the Wolfson Prize for History. It also won the PEN Hessell-Tiltman Prize for History, was shortlisted for the Authors' Club Banister Fletcher Award for Art History, and was listed for the Samuel Johnson Prize for non-fiction (now the Baillie Gifford Prize).

His The First Bohemians: Life and Art in London's Golden Age (Allen Lane and Penguin, 2013) is a history of 'proto-bohemian' Covent Garden and the 'lower' art world in eighteenth-century London. It argues for the significance of the arts that celebrated 'real life' in that era. It was shortlisted for the Hessell-Tiltman Prize for History.

Each of these books has resulted in extensive television and radio contributions and book festival talks. In 2010 Alastair Lawrence's BBC4 television series 'Rude Britannia' was underpinned by Gatrell's 'City of Laughter'.

Gatrell's Conspiracy on Cato Street: Liberty and Revolution in Regency London was published by Cambridge University Press in April 2022 and was anticipated in his 2020 lecture on the Cato Street Conspiracy for Gresham College. The book was shortlisted for the Duff Cooper Prize and was listed as a best book of 2022 by History Today and the Daily Telegraph.

His Farewell the Jacarandas: Growing up in Apartheid South Africa: A Cambridge Historian's Memoir was self-published on Amazon in 2024.

== Awards ==
- 1976 T.S.Ashton Prize of the Economic History Society, winner for 'Labour Power and the Size of Firms in the Lancashire Cotton Industry', Economic History Review, XXX (1), Feb 1977
- 1994 The Whitfield Prize of the Royal Historical Society, winner for The Hanging Tree: Execution and the English People
- 1997 Senior Visiting Fellow, Lewis Walpole Library, Yale University
- 2002 Visiting Fellow, Australian National University, Canberra
- 2006 Wolfson History Prize, City of Laughter, co-winner
- 2006 PEN Hessell-Tiltman Prize, City of Laughter, winner
- 2006 Authors' Club Banister Fletcher Award in art history: City of Laughter shortlisted
- 2006 Samuel Johnson Prize for Non-Fiction: City of Laughter listed
- 2010 Times Higher Education: Hanging Tree in 'The Canon' of seminal works
- 2014 PEN Hessell-Tiltman Prize: The First Bohemians, finalist
- 2022 Pol Roger Prize: Conspiracy on Cato Street, shortlisted

== Select bibliography ==
- Robert Owen: A New View of Society and Report to the County of Lanark (ed. with intro. by V.A.C.Gatrell, Penguin, 1971)
- Crime and the Law: the Social History of Crime in Western Europe since 1500 (Europa, 1980) (ed. with Bruce Lenman and Geoffrey Parker)
- "Crime, Authority, and the Policeman-State", in F. M. L. Thompson (ed.), The Cambridge Social History of Britain 1750-1950, vol. iii, pp. 243 – 310.
- The Hanging Tree: Execution and the English People 1770-1868 (Oxford, 1994)
- City of Laughter: Sex and Satire in Eighteenth-century London (Atlantic, 2006)
- Thomas Rowlandson: Pleasures and Pursuits in Georgian England (Vassar College, 2010), by Patricia Phagan, Vic Gatrell and Amelia Rauser (exhibition catalogue and texts)
- The First Bohemians: Life and Art in London's Golden Age (Allen Lane, 2013)
- Conspiracy on Cato Street: Liberty and Revolution in Regency London (Cambridge University Press, 2022)
- Farewell The Jacarandas: Growing Up in Apartheid South Africa: a Cambridge Historian's Memoir (Owlstone Press, 2024).
