= The First Bohemians =

2013 book by Vic Gatrell

The First Bohemians: Life and Art in London's Golden Age
- Cover of the first edition
- Author: Vic Gatrell
- Language: English
- Subjects: Covent Garden, History of London
- Set in: Covent Garden
- Published: London
- Publisher: Allen Lane, Penguin (2014)
- Publication date: 2013
- Publication place: United Kingdom
- Media type: Print
- Pages: 512
- ISBN: 9780718195830
- Dewey Decimal: 942.107

The First Bohemians: Life and Art in London's Golden Age is a 2013 book by the British writer and academic Vic Gatrell.

== Synopsis ==
The book details the colourful history of the London district of Covent Garden which Gatrell describes as "teeming, disordered and sexually charged" and argues was the world's first "creative Bohemia". During the 18th century many of the UK's most significant artists, actors, poets, novelists, and dramatists lived in the district. The book features more than 200 pictures, many of which have been rarely seen.

== Reception ==
In Times Higher Education Supplement, Clare Brant praised the "evocation of non-conformists in the capital’s cultural ‘heart’", which she described as "compelling". In The Guardian Faramerz Dabhoiwala wrote that "Gatrell's book does it (the history of Covent Garden) justice in all the right ways. It is beautifully produced – from the sumptuous, almost three-dimensional dust jacket to the more than 200 illustrations sprinkled liberally throughout the text" and that the "book is mainly a celebration: a relaxed, confident and triumphantly successful re-creation of a fascinating world of male companionship, drunkenness, poverty, sex and art".

In the New Statesman Frances Wilson wrote that the author is "terrific company" and "The First Bohemians is generously, often ingeniously, illustrated". The book was also reviewed in The Economist, in which the reviewer wrote that the "richness of detail makes The First Bohemians a pleasure to read".

The First Bohemians was shortlisted for the Hessell-Tiltman Prize in 2014.
