= Olwen Carey Evans =

Welsh humanitarian (1892–1990)

Lady Olwen Elizabeth Carey Evans DBE
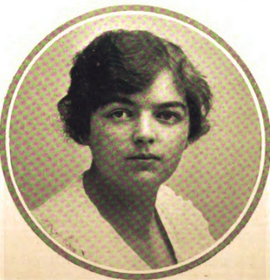
- Born: Olwen Elizabeth Lloyd George; April 3, 1892; Criccieth, Wales, United Kingdom
- Died: March 2, 1990 (aged 97); Criccieth, Wales, United Kingdom
- Spouse: Thomas Carey Evans (m. 1917; died 1947)
- Children: 4
- Parents: David Lloyd George (father); Margaret Lloyd George (mother)
- Relatives: Richard Lloyd George, 2nd Earl Lloyd-George of Dwyfor (Brother); Gwilym Lloyd George, 1st Viscount Tenby (Brother); Lady Megan Lloyd George (Sister); One other (sibling)
- Awards: British War Medal; Victory Medal
- Honours: Dame Commander of the Order of the British Empire

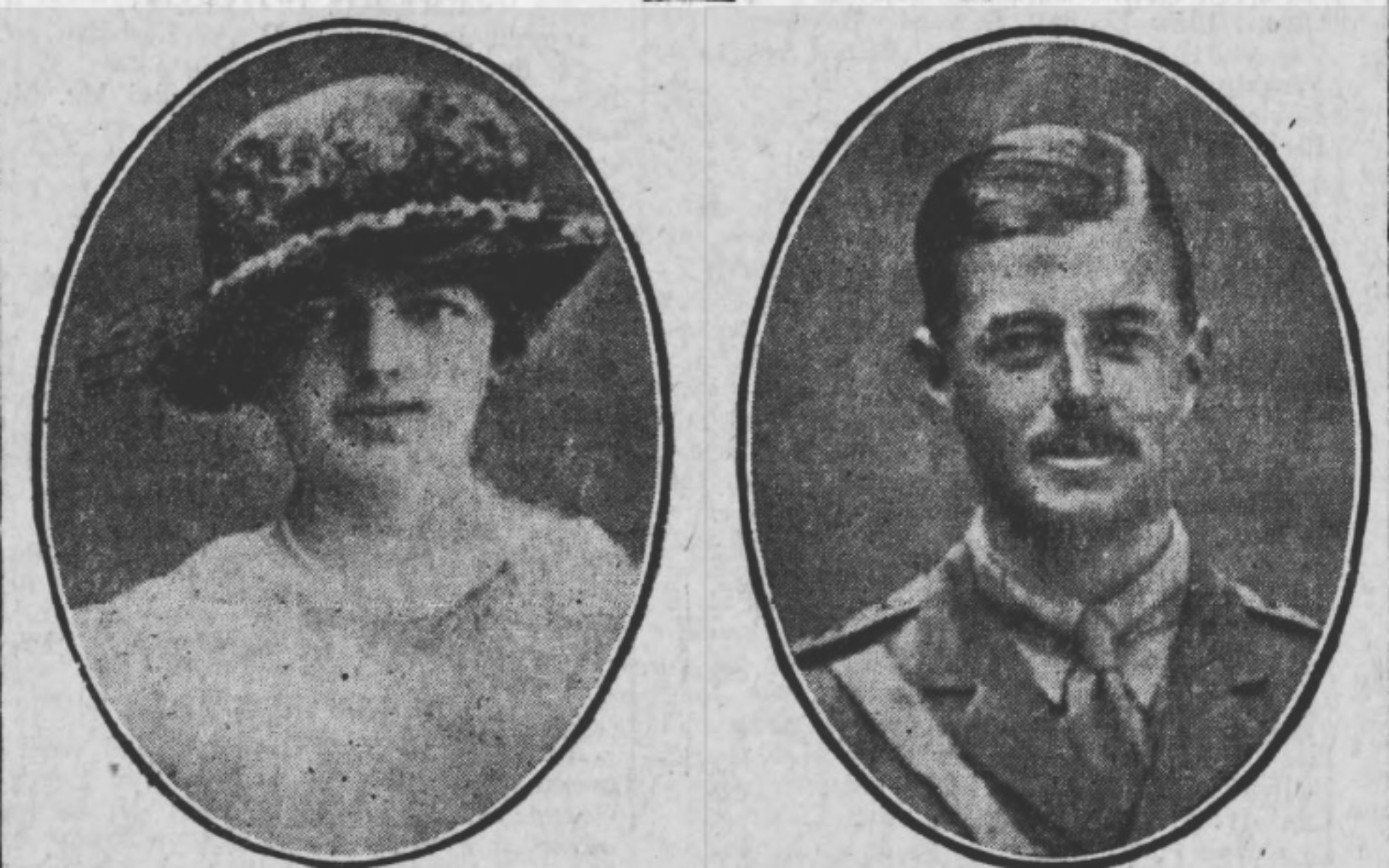
Olwen Lloyd George and Captain Thomas Carey Evans at the time of their engagement

Lady Olwen Elizabeth Carey Evans DBE (née Lloyd George; 3 April 1892 – 2 March 1990) was a Welsh humanitarian and daughter of British Prime Minister David Lloyd George. She was known as Lady Carey Evans from when her husband was knighted in 1924 until her father was made an Earl.

Born at Bryn Awelon, Criccieth, the third child of David Lloyd George, then an MP, and his wife Margaret, in 1917, she married Captain Thomas Carey Evans (1884–1947) at the Welsh Baptist Church in Westminster, London. As her father was the Prime Minister, the wedding drew considerable public interest and a telegram of congratulation from the king.

Captain Evans was a surgeon in the Indian Medical Service who was awarded the Military Cross in 1916 and was knighted in 1924. After leaving the army in 1926 he worked as a surgeon in London, becoming the first medical superintendent of Hammersmith Hospital in 1936. They had four children: Margaret, Eiluned, Robert, and David.

During the First World War she served with the British Red Cross Society in the Voluntary Aid Detachment and served as a cook on the Western Front. She was awarded the British War Medal and Victory Medal. She remained active in charitable work, serving as honorary or local presidents for Royal National Lifeboat Institution, Royal Society for the Blind, and the National Society for the Prevention of Cruelty to Children.

In the 1969 Investiture Honours she was appointed Dame Commander of the Order of the British Empire for public services to Wales. In 1985 she published a memoir, Lloyd George was My Father.

== Death ==
She died on 2 March 1990 at her farm Eisteddfa, near Criccieth, after a short illness, the last surviving child of David Lloyd George.

== Bibliography ==
- Carey Evans, Lady Olwen; Garner Mary (1985). Lloyd George was My Father: The Autobiography of Lady Olwen Carey Evans. Gomer Press. ISBN 978-0-86383-112-6.
