= Peacemakers (book) =

2001 book by Margaret MacMillan

Peacemakers: The Paris Peace Conference of 1919 and Its Attempt to End War
- Author: Margaret MacMillan
- Language: English
- Subject: 1919 Paris Peace Conference
- Publisher: John Murray
- Publication date: 2001
- Publication place: United Kingdom
- Awards: Duff Cooper Prize; Governor General's Literary Award; Hessell-Tiltman Prize; Samuel Johnson Prize
- ISBN: 978-0-7195-5939-6
- Dewey Decimal: 940.3/141
- LC Class: D644 .M33

Peacemakers: The Paris Peace Conference of 1919 and Its Attempt to End War (2001) is a historical narrative about the events of the Paris Peace Conference of 1919. It was written by the Canadian historian Margaret MacMillan with a foreword by the American diplomat Richard Holbrooke. The book has also been published under the titles Paris 1919: Six Months That Changed the World and Peacemakers: Six Months That Changed the World.

Peacemakers describes the six months of negotiations that took place in Paris, France, following World War I. The book focuses on the "Big Three", who are photographed together on its cover (left to right): Prime Minister David Lloyd George of the United Kingdom, Prime Minister Georges Clemenceau of France, and President Woodrow Wilson of the United States.

The author argues that the conditions imposed on Germany in the Treaty of Versailles did not lead to the rise of Adolf Hitler and asks whether the Great War was "an unmitigated catastrophe in a sea of mud", or instead was "about something". She concludes, "It is condescending and wrong to think they were hoodwinked".

During the later part of the war, the British prime minister was David Lloyd George, the author's great-grandfather.

== Reception ==
The book was first published in Britain. It won the £5,000 Duff Cooper Prize for an outstanding literary work in the field of history, biography or politics, the £3,000 Hessell-Tiltman Prize for History, the BBC Samuel Johnson Prize for the best work of non-fiction published in the United Kingdom, and the 2003 Governor General's Literary Award in Canada.

The book was adapted as a 2009 docudrama film entitled "Paris 1919", by Paul Cowan, produced by the National Film Board of Canada. MacMillan recorded a related series of fourteen lectures for the audiobook Six Months That Changed the World: The Paris Peace Conference of 1919 (Recorded Books, The Modern Scholar series, 2003).

== Editions ==
- ISBN 0-7195-5939-1 UK Hardbound Edition (2001)
- ISBN 0-375-50826-0 US Hardbound Edition (2002) as Paris 1919: Six months that changed the world
- ISBN 0-375-76052-0 US Paperback Edition (2003) as Paris 1919: Six months that changed the world
- ISBN 0-7195-6237-6, ISBN 0-7195-6233-3 UK Paperback Edition (2003)

Awards
Preceded by Saboteurs	Governor General's Award for English language non-fiction recipient 2003	Succeeded by Shake Hands with the Devil
