= Katherine Southwood =

British theologian

Katherine E. Southwood is British theologian. She is Professor of Hebrew Bible/Old Testament and Tutorial Fellow in Theology & Religion at St John's College, Oxford.

Southwood was educated at comprehensive schools in North West London. After leaving school she got a job doing data entry while attending evening classes in Hebrew at Birkbeck College. She graduated with a first-class degree in Theology from Durham University in 2005, and later obtained a Masters in Classical Hebrew and a DPhil from the University of Oxford.

She was a Kennicott Fellow in Oxford and then secured a permanent post in St Mary’s University College, Twickenham. She joined the Faculty of Theology and Religion at Oxford in 2013.
