= Jenny Uglow =

English biographer and critic (born 1947)

Jenny Uglow OBE FRSL
- Born: Crowther; March 28, 1947 (age 79)
- Education: Cheltenham Ladies' College St Anne's College, Oxford
- Spouse(s): Steve Uglow, m. 1971
- Children: 4
- Writing career
- Genre: Non-fiction
- Subject: Arts
- Notable awards: James Tait Black Memorial Prize; Hessell-Tiltman Prize; Marfield Prize

Jennifer Sheila Uglow (née Crowther, born 1947) is an English biographer, historian, critic and publisher, and a former editorial director of Chatto & Windus. She has written critically-acclaimed biographies of Elizabeth Gaskell, William Hogarth, Thomas Bewick, Edward Lear and Gilbert White, as well as a group biography of the Lunar Society and a panoramic account of living in Britain through the Napoleonic wars.

Among various prizes and awards, she has won the 2002 James Tait Black Memorial Prize and the 2003 Hessell-Tiltman Prize for The Lunar Men: The Friends who Made the Future 1730–1810, and the 2018 Hawthornden Prize for Mr Lear: A Life of Art and Nonsense. She has also chaired the Council of the Royal Society of Literature, and was awarded the society's Benson Medal in 2012. She has honorary degrees and in 2008, she was awarded the OBE for services to literature and publishing.

== Early life and education ==
Uglow was brought up in Cumbria and later Dorset. She attended Cheltenham Ladies' College (1958–64) and St Anne's College, University of Oxford. After gaining a first in English, she took a BLitt.

== Career ==
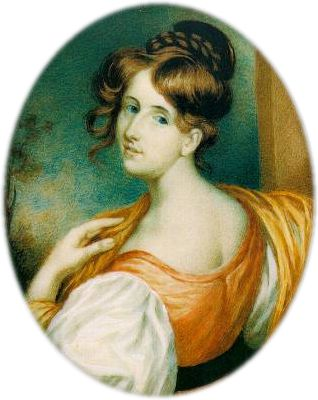
Elizabeth Gaskell, subject of one of Uglow's earliest biographies

After leaving university, Uglow worked in publishing and until 2013 was an editorial director of the publishing company Chatto & Windus, an imprint of Random House.

She has been an honorary visiting professor at the University of Warwick, and for many years acted as a trustee of the Wordsworth Trust. She was formerly a member of the British Library's Advisory Group for the Humanities. A fellow of the Royal Society of Literature, she is a past chair of its Council, and as of 2017, serves as one of its vice-presidents. She is also a Fellow of the Linnean Society, Vice-president of the Gaskell Society, and an honorary Fellow of St Anne's College, Oxford.

=== Biographies ===
Uglow compiled an encyclopaedia of biographies of prominent women, first published in 1982; the work is currently in its fourth edition and contains more than 2,000 biographies, though later versions involved other editors. Uglow later wrote:

I embarked on the Macmillan Biographical Dictionary of Women in a fit of pique because all reference books were full of men: it was a mad undertaking, born of a time when feminists wanted heroines and didn't have Google.

Her first full-length biographies, depicting the Victorian women writers George Eliot (1987) and Elizabeth Gaskell (1993), continued her interest in documenting women, and her literary background.

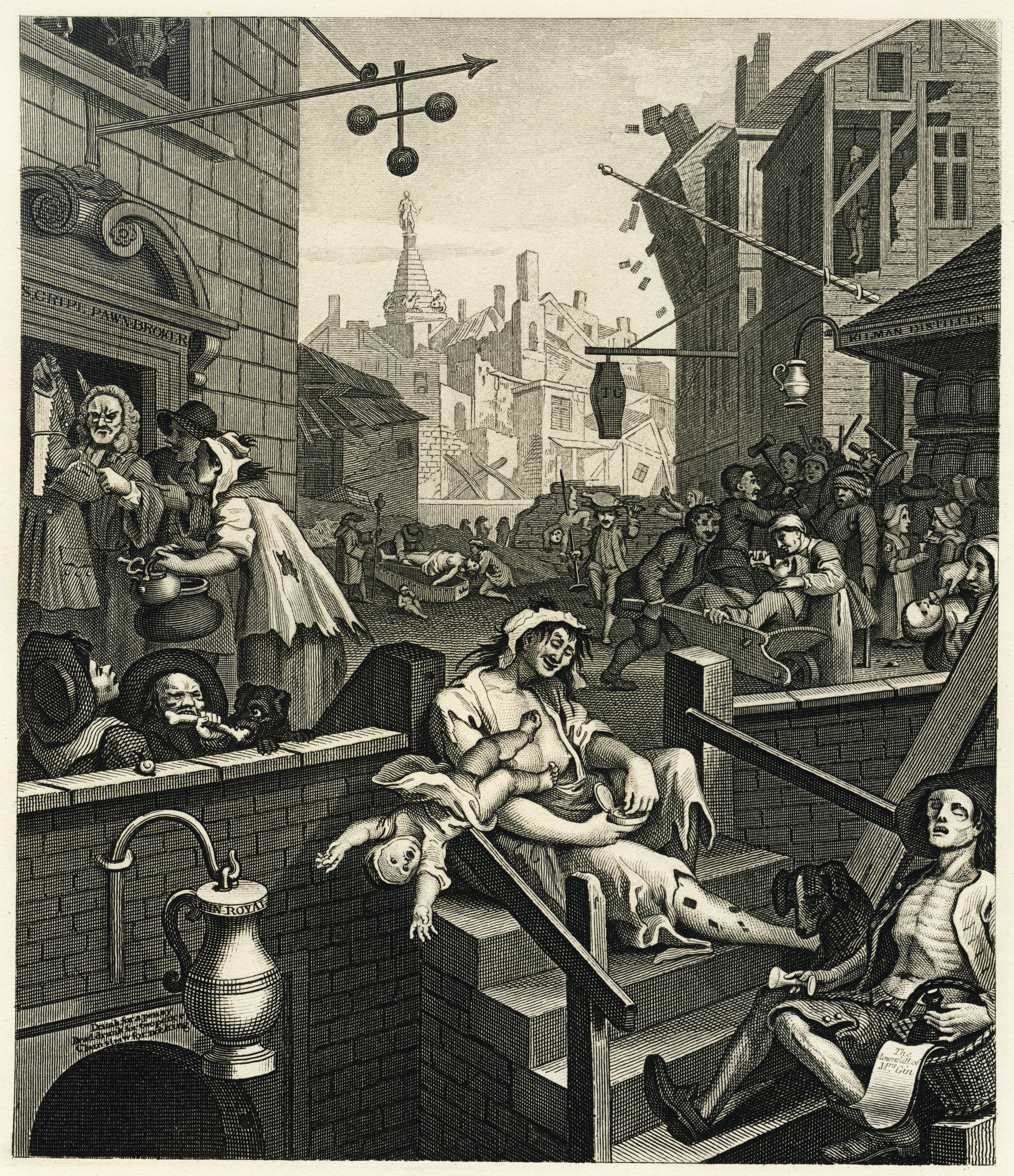
Gin Lane, by William Hogarth

Subsequent works moved further into the past, with subjects including the 18th century author Henry Fielding (1995), and artists William Hogarth (1997), Thomas Bewick (2006) and Edward Lear. The scientists and engineers of the Lunar Society, including Erasmus Darwin, Matthew Boulton, James Watt, Joseph Priestley and Josiah Wedgwood, are the subject of her prize-winning work The Lunar Men (2003).The Pinecone: A Life of Sarah Losh (2012), tells the story of a pioneering Victorian woman architect, while InThese Times (2014) is a large-scale group biography exploring the home front during the Napoleonic wars. Her latest book A Year with Gilbert White: The First Great Nature Writer (2025) examines the life of the 18^{th} century naturalist Gilbert White through his journal for 1781.

Work on more recent periods includes Sybil and Cyril ( 2021), a joint biography of the 1930s lino-cut artists Sybil Andrews and Cyril Power, and The Quentin Blake Book (2022), which was written to mark the artist’s 90^{th} birthday.

Uglow's biographies have always been particularly praised for their vivid, detailed recreation of the time and place in which their subjects lived. "No one gives us the feel of past life as she does" writes A. S. Byatt of Nature's Engraver: A Life of Thomas Bewick, and a review of The Lunar Men in The Observer claims "never has the eighteenth century come so much to life." Her book on Gilbert White was described in The Observer as ”A glorious celebration of curiosity and nature.”

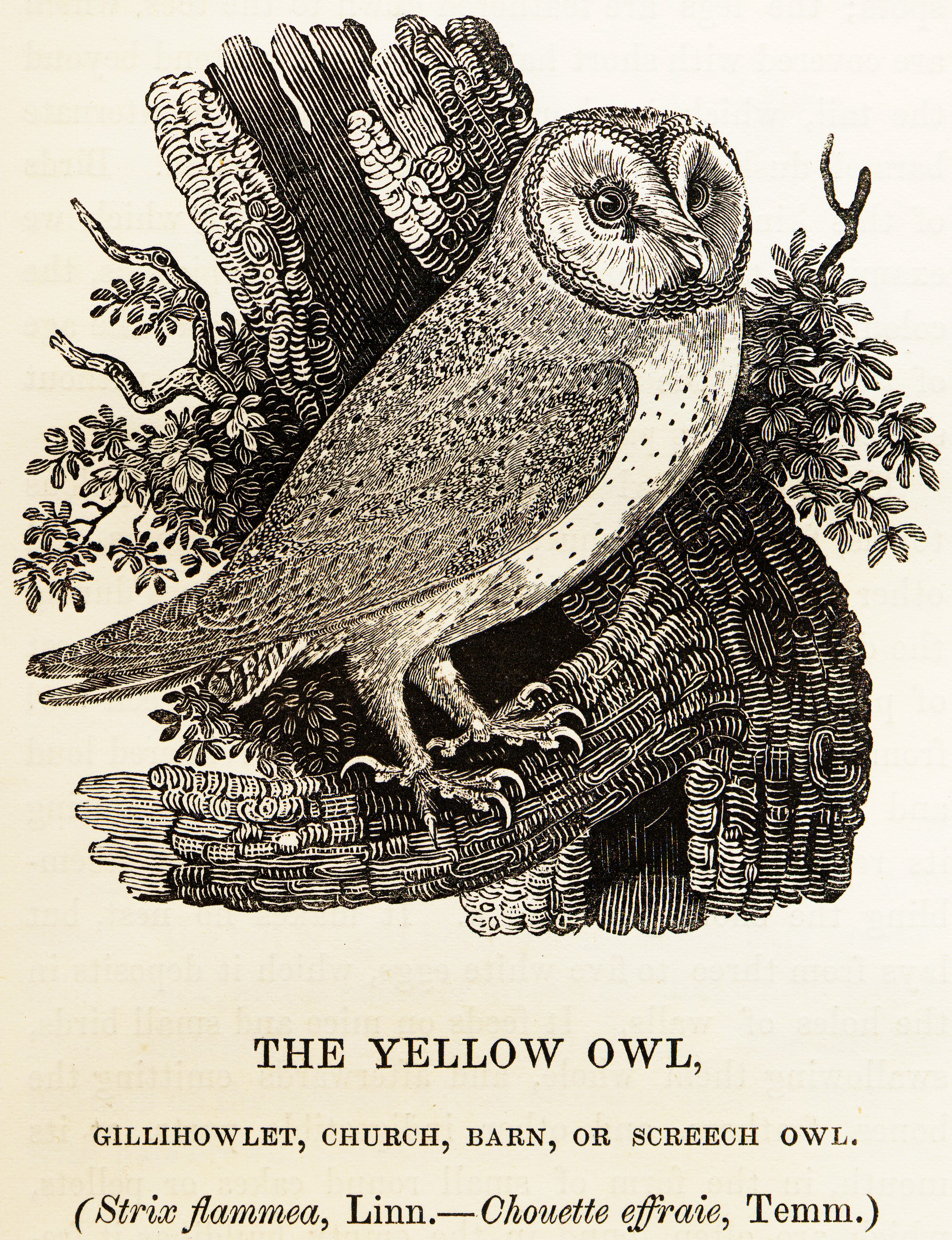
Wood-engraving by Thomas Bewick from History of British Birds

=== Other writing and editing ===
Uglow's non-biographical writing includes a history of gardening in Britain, written for the bicentenary of the Royal Horticultural Society in 2004, which Uglow describes as a "labour of love".

She has also edited collections of writings by Walter Pater (1973) and Angela Carter (1997), as well as co-editing, with Francis Spufford, Cultural Babbage: Time, Technology and Invention (1997), a selection of essays by scientists and writers.

=== Radio, television and film ===
Uglow has taken part in many television and radio programmes, including presentingThe Poet of Albion, a BBC Radio 4 programme on William Blake, part of a series marking the 250th anniversary of the poet's birth; the programme emphasised Blake's radicalism. In the past she acted as a historical consultant on several period dramas for the BBC, including Wives and Daughters (1999), Daniel Deronda (2002), He Knew He Was Right (2004), North and South (2004), Bleak House (2005) and Cranford (2007), as well as for the films Pride and Prejudice (2005) and Miss Potter (2006).

== Awards and honours ==
Awards and honours

- 1993: Portico Prize, Elizabeth Gaskell
- 1995: Rose Mary Crawshay Prize, Elizabeth Gaskell
- 2002 : James Tait Black Memorial Prize for biography, The Lunar Men
- 2003: Hessell-Tiltman Prize for history, International PEN, The Lunar Men
- 2007: Marfield Prize, National Award for Arts writing, Nature’s Engraver
- 2008: OBE for services to literature and publishing
- 2008: Samuel Johnson Prize, shortlist, A Gambling Man
- 2012: Benson Prize, Royal Society of Literature
- 2013: Bill Rollinson Prize for Landscape and Tradition, The Pinecone
- 2014: Duff Cooper Prize, shortlist, In These Times
- 2015: Hessel-Tiltman Prize shortlist, In These Times
- 2018: Hawthornden Prize, Mr Lear
- 2018: Harvey Darton Award, Children’s Book Society, Mr Lear

== Personal life ==
In 1971, Uglow married Steve Uglow, professor emeritus at the University of Kent; the couple have two sons and two daughters and eight grandchildren. For many years they lived in Canterbury and they now live in Borrowdale, Cumberland.

== Bibliography ==
=== Biographies and studies ===
- Macmillan Dictionary of Women's Biography (1982, 4^{th} edition with Maggy Hendry, 2005)
- George Eliot
- Elizabeth Gaskell: A Habit of Stories (1993)
- Henry Fielding (1995)
- Hogarth: A Life and a World (1997)
- Dr Johnson, His Club and Other Friends, National Portrait Gallery, (1998)
- The Lunar Men: The Friends Who Made the Future (2002)
- Nature's Engraver: A Life of Thomas Bewick (2006)
- Words and Pictures: Writers, Artists and a Peculiarly British Tradition (2008)
- A Gambling Man: Charles II and the Restoration(2010)
- The Pinecone: The Story of Sarah Losh, Forgotten Romantic Heroine—Antiquarian, Architect, and Visionary (2012)
- In These Times: Living in Britain through Napoleon's Wars, 1793-1815 (2014)
- Mr. Lear: A Life of Art and Nonsense (2017)
- Sybil & Cyril: Cutting Through Time (2021)
- The Quentin Blake Book (2022)
- A Year with Gilbert White: The First Great Nature Writer (2025)
- Other non-fiction
- A Little History of British Gardening (2004, 2012)
- As editor
- Walter Pater: Essays on Literature and Art (1973)
- The Chatto Book of Ghosts (1994), reissued as The Vintage Book of Ghosts (1997)
- Cultural Babbage: Technology, Time and Invention (with Francis Spufford; 1996)
- Shaking a Leg: Collected Writings (by Angela Carter) (1997)

== See also ==
- Literature
