= Francesca Stavrakopoulou =

British biblical scholar (born 1975)

- Φραντζέσκα Σταυρακοπούλου
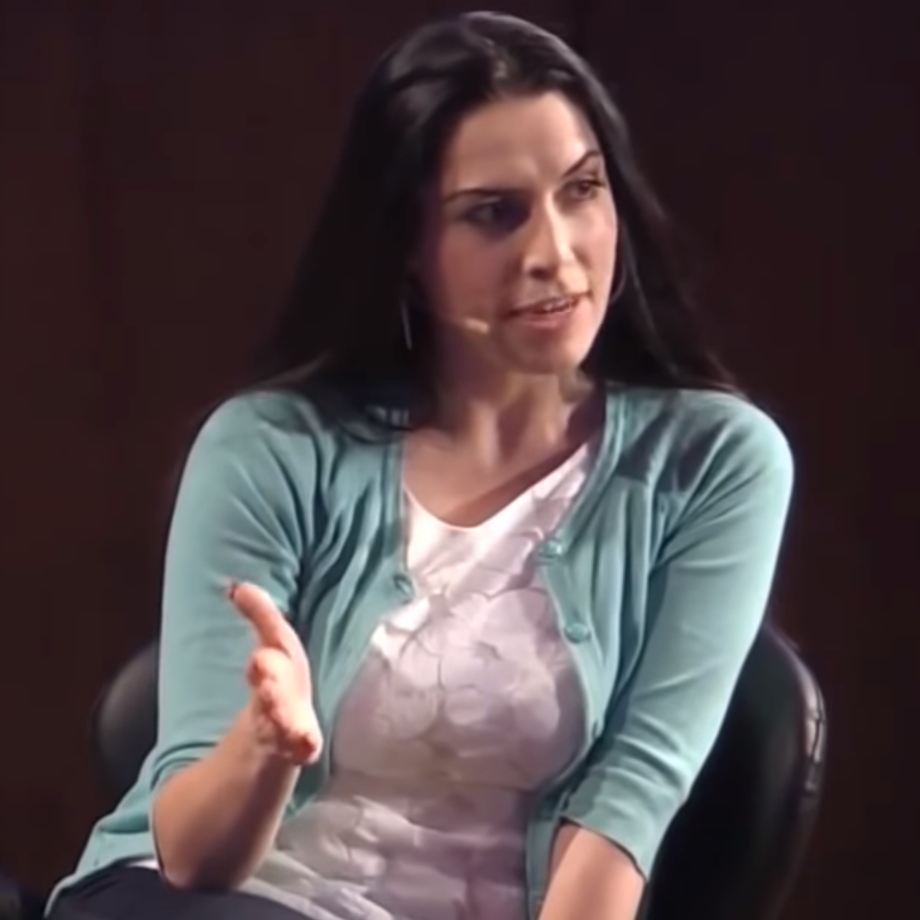
- Stavrakopoulou in Conway Hall in 2015
- Born: 3 October 1975 (age 51); Bromley, Greater London, England, UK
- Title: Professor of Hebrew Bible and Ancient Religion

Academic background
- Education: Oxford University
- Thesis: King Manasseh and Child Sacrifice: Biblical Distortions of Historical Realities (2002)

Academic work
- Discipline: Biblical studies
- Institutions: University of Exeter
- Notable students: Daniel McClellan
- Main interests: History of ancient Israel and Judah

Francesca Stavrakopoulou (/ˌstævrækəˈpuːluː/ stav-rack-ə-POO-loo; Greek: Φραντζέσκα Σταυρακοπούλου; born 3 October 1975) is a British biblical scholar and broadcaster. She is currently Professor of Hebrew Bible and Ancient Religion at the University of Exeter. The main focus of her research is on the Hebrew Bible, and on Israelite and Judahite history and religion.

She also popularises biblical historical subjects as a TV presenter on BBC2 and Channel 4. She comments on the historicity of the Bible, the role of women in the Abrahamic religions, and the development of the Biblical texts.

== Early life and education ==
Francesca Stavrakopoulou was born on 3 October 1975 to an English mother and a Greek father. Stavrakopoulou was brought up in no particular religion and is a self-described atheist. She was educated at the Godolphin and Latymer School and won an exhibition to Worcester College, Oxford.

== Career ==
Stavrakopoulou was awarded a D.Phil. in theology by the University of Oxford. Her dissertation, which examined the creation of an imagined past within the Hebrew Bible, was subsequently published as King Manasseh and Child Sacrifice: Biblical Distortions of Historical Realities.

She filled teaching and research positions at Worcester College as a junior research fellow and as a career development fellow in the Faculty of Theology until leaving Oxford in 2005.

Upon her departure from Oxford, Stavrakopoulou took up a position in Hebrew Bible and Ancient Religion in the University of Exeter's Department of Theology and Religion, rising to the level of senior lecturer by March 2011. She was head of Theology and Religion at Exeter between 2013 and 2016.

Stavrakopoulou was secretary of the British-based Society for Old Testament Study in 2011, and member of the European Association of Biblical Studies and of the US-based Society of Biblical Literature.

In 2021, she published God: An Anatomy, her first book for non-scholarly audiences.

=== Public appearances and presentations ===
Stavrakopoulou talks with Samira Ahmed, Giles Fraser and Adam Rutherford at Conway Hall in 2015.

Stavrakopoulou has appeared on several occasions in BBC One's programme featuring "moral, ethical and religious debates," The Big Questions hosted by Nicky Campbell; appearances include on the topics "Is the Bible still relevant?", "Is there a difference between a religion and a cult?", and "Are religions unfair to women?"

Stavrakopoulou has been writer and presenter for media productions relating to her scholarly and political interests. She contributed to Channel 4's series The Bible: A History (2010), regarding the historicity of Moses. Her first primetime presentation was a three-part television series for the BBC2 The Bible's Buried Secrets (2011; not to be confused with NOVA's 2008 programme of the same name).

She is also a patron of Humanists UK and has spoken on the history of religion and religious depictions of female sexuality at the Humanists UK Annual Convention in 2016 and the 2014 World Humanist Congress in Oxford respectively.

She has written about some of the sexist responses to her work, listing letters and emails she has received as a result of her work in religious studies.

== Scholarly positions ==
The main focus of Stavrakopoulou's research is on the Hebrew Bible, and on Israelite and Judahite history and religion.

Stavrakopoulou argues that important figures in the Hebrew Bible were not historical figures as represented in the text. She has further stated that she believes "very little, probably" of the Hebrew Bible is historical fact, based on the arguments that ancient writers had an understanding of "fact" and "fiction" very different from a modern understanding, and that the Hebrew Bible "wasn't written to be a factual account of the past". She concludes that she does not believe accounts of Moses and King David in the Hebrew Bible to be factual and that "as an historian of the bible, I think there is very little that is factual". She later reaffirmed that David possibly existed based on archaeological evidence: "Yeah, possibly David existed. I think probably not".

In her 2021 book, God: An Anatomy, Stavrakopoulou "presents a vividly corporeal image of God: a human-shaped deity who walks and talks and weeps and laughs, who eats, sleeps, feels, and breathes, and who is undeniably male. Here is a portrait—arrived at through the author's close examination of and research into the Bible—of a god in ancient myths and rituals who was a product of a particular society, at a particular time, made in the image of the people who lived then, shaped by their own circumstances and experience of the world". The book has been described by John Barton as showing that the non-corporeal God of Judaism and Christianity "was not yet so in the Bible, where God appears in a much more corporeal form". By contrast, R. W. L. Moberly took a more critical approach to Stavrakopoulou's book and argues that she misunderstands the traditional interpretation of the Hebrew Bible and that the passages that she cites as describing God in anthropomorphic terms are better understood as metaphorical.

== Major published works ==
=== Books ===
Stavrakopoulou's dissertation-based monograph, and her subsequent authored book-length publications are:

- King Manasseh and Child Sacrifice: Biblical Distortions of Historical Realities. Berlin: Walter de Gruyter. 2004. ISBN 978-3-11-017994-1.
- Land of Our Fathers: The Roles of Ancestor Veneration in Biblical Land Claims. New York: T&T Clark. 2010. ISBN 978-0-567-02881-5.
- Reading the Hebrew Bible. Routledge. 2012. ISBN 978-0-415-47141-1.
- God: An Anatomy (hardcover 1st ed.). London: Picador. 2021. ISBN 978-1-5098-6733-2.

=== Theses ===
Stavrakopoulou's academic theses include:

- Biblical Distortions of Historical Realities: A Study with Particular Reference to King Manasseh and Child Sacrifice (2002). PhD thesis, University of Oxford. OCLC 59313595.
- Discerning the Nature of Academic Theology (2005). Dip. L.A.T.H.E. thesis, University of Oxford. OCLC 66385438.

=== Edited ===
Volumes edited or co-edited by Stavrakopoulou include:

- Religious Diversity in Ancient Israel and Judah (2010). Edited with J. Barton. New York, NY: T&T Clark. ISBN 978-0-567-03215-7
- Ecological Hermeneutics: Biblical, Historical and Theological Perspectives (2010). Edited with D. G. Horrell, C. Hunt, and C. Southgate. New York, NY: T&T Clark. ISBN 978-0-567-03303-1

=== Journal articles and book chapters ===
Stavrakopoulou's major journal articles and authored book chapters include:

- "Exploring the Garden of Uzza: Death, Burial and Ideologies of Kingship" (2006). In Biblica, 87(1), pp. 1–21. JSTOR 42614642
- "Gog's Grave and the Use and Abuse of Corpses in Ezekiel 39:11–20" (2010). In Journal of Biblical Literature, 129(1), pp. 67–84. DOI 10.2307/27821005 JSTOR 27821005
- "'Popular' Religion and 'Official' Religion: Practice, Perception, Portrayal" (2010). In J. Barton (ed.), Religious Diversity in Ancient Israel and Judah, pp. 37–58. New York, NY: T&T Clark. ISBN 978-0-567-03215-7
- "Tree-Hogging in Eden: Divine Restriction and Royal Rejection in Genesis 2–3" (2011). In M. Higton, C. Rowland, and J. Law (eds.), Theology and Human Flourishing: Essays in Honor of Timothy J. Gorringe, pp. 41–53. Eugene, OR: Wipf and Stock. ISBN 978-1-62189-884-9
- "Religion at Home: The Materiality of Practice" (2016). In S. Niditch (ed.), The Wiley Blackwell Companion to Ancient Israel, pp. 347–365. New York, NY: Wiley-Blackwell. ISBN 978-0-470-65677-8
