= Thomas Carey Evans =

Welsh surgeon

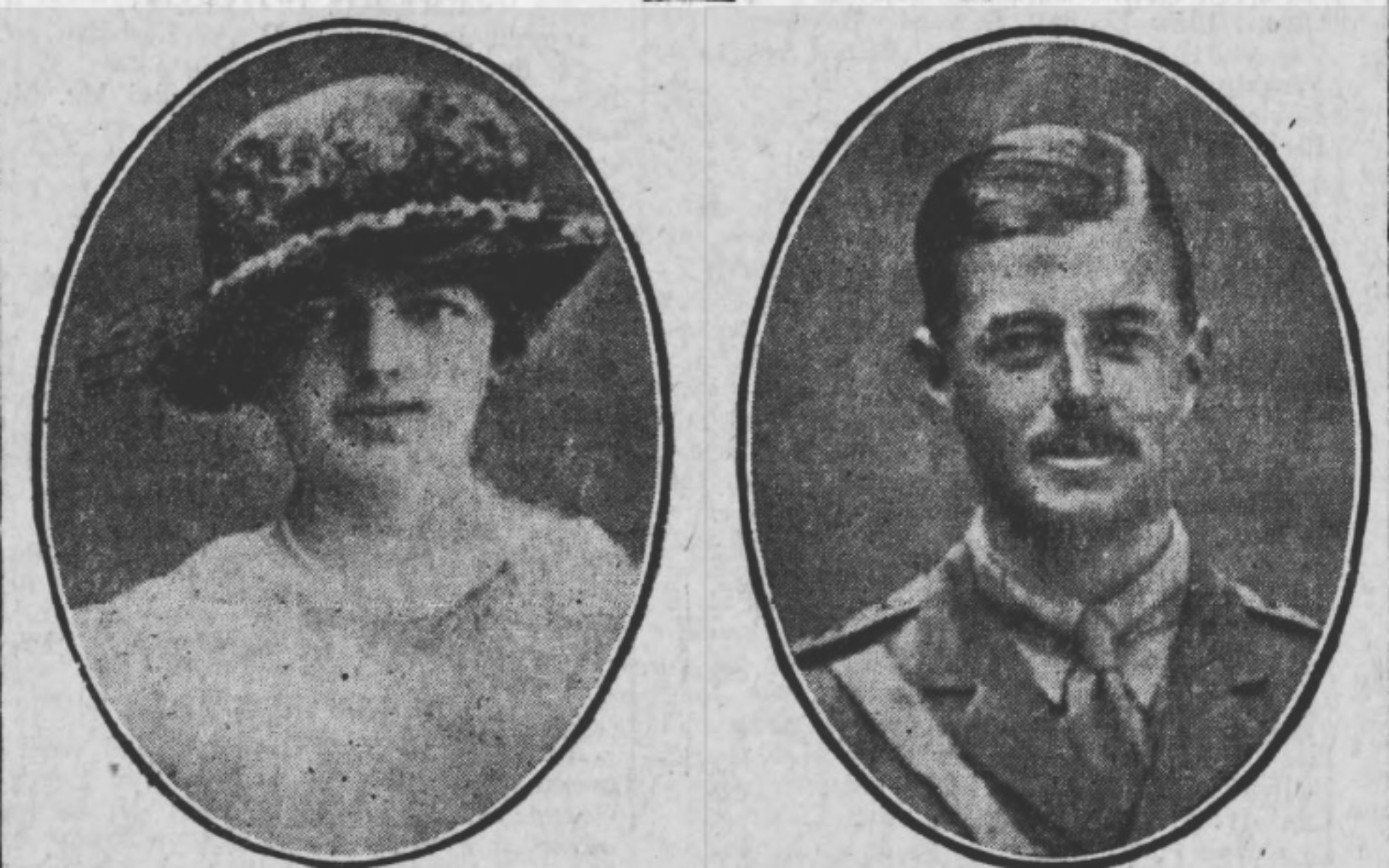
Marriage of Evans and his wife

Major Sir Thomas John Carey Evans MC FRCS (6 June 1884 – 25 August 1947) was a Welsh surgeon who served as a doctor in the British army in India and as the first inspector of the British Postgraduate Medical School, when the school was founded at Hammersmith Hospital, London.

== Personal life ==
Carey Evans was born in Blaenau Ffestiniog the son of Robert Davies Evans, a family doctor and Elizabeth Jones his wife. Elizabeth was the sister of Sir Robert Armstrong-Jones. He graduated from Cardiff University and went to Medical School at Glasgow University and then St Bartholomew's Hospital in London.

In 1917 he married Olwen Lloyd George, eldest daughter of the Right Honorable David Lloyd George, who was serving as Prime Minister at the time. They had two daughters and two sons - Margaret, Eiluned, Robert and David. Eiluned was the mother of Margaret MacMillan, historian and warden of St Anthony's College, Oxford. Margaret is the maternal aunt of the historian and broadcaster Dan Snow.

== Military service ==
He joined the 7th Battalion, the Royal Welsh Fusiliers, in 1908 as a lieutenant. On 31 July 1909 he was commissioned a lieutenant in the Indian Medical Service. In 1910 he was appointed surgical specialist in the Lucknow division. He was involved in a battle at Abor on the North East border of India between 1911 and 1912, winning the Indian General Service Medal. He was promoted to captain on 31 July 1912. He served as medical officer to the Mishin campaign, which explored the Tibetan border and mapped the upper course of the Brahmaputra river.

During the First World War he served with the Indian Army at Gallipoli, in Egypt, and in Mesopotamia, where he was a civil medical officer in Baghdad in 1917. He was awarded the Military Cross (MC) on 3 June 1916 and was created a Chevalier in the Légion d'Honneur on 24 October 1919. In 1920 Evans was appointed resident medical officer for the State of Mysore. He was promoted to major in the Indian Military Service in 1921. He was knighted in the 1924 Birthday Honours, and retired from the army in 1926.

== After service ==
After returning from India he worked as a doctor in London serving as a consultant surgeon at St Paul's Hospital for sexually transmitted diseases. In 1936 he was appointed the first inspector of the British Postgraduate Medical School, when the school was founded at Hammersmith Hospital, London. During the Second World War he served as a medical major in the Home Guard. He retired in 1946 and died a year later of a heart attack.
