= Jerry Brotton =

British historian

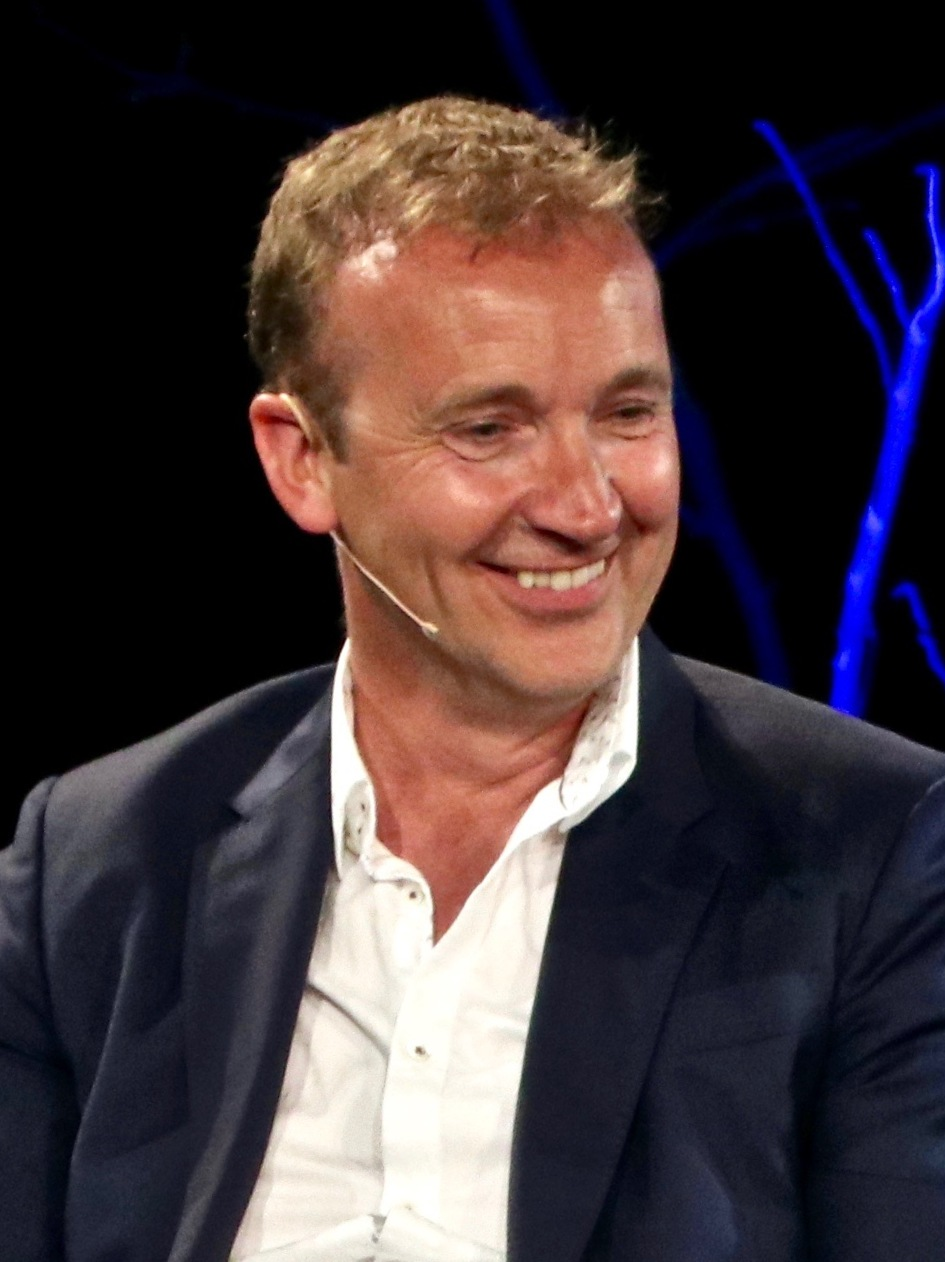
Jerry Brotton, 2016

Jerry Brotton is a British historian. He is Professor of Renaissance Studies at Queen Mary University of London, a television and radio presenter and a curator.

Brotton writes about literature, history, material culture, trade, and east-west relations, particularly in the sixteenth and seventeenth centuries. He employs interdisciplinary approaches, looking at art, politics, history, travel writing and literature. His book A History of the World in Twelve Maps (Allen Lane, 2012) has been translated into twelve languages. It was accompanied by a three-part series on BBC Four, Maps: Power, Plunder and Possession. His The Sale of the Late King's Goods: Charles I and His Art Collection (Macmillan, 2006) was nominated for the Samuel Johnson Prize (now the Baillie Gifford Prize). It wryly proposes that the dispersal of Charles I's art collection in 1649 was a democratic move, one that merits imitation in the contemporary world. His 2016 book This Orient Isle: Elizabethan England and the Islamic World (London: Allen Lane, 2016) was serialised on BBC Radio 4 and won the Historical Writers Association Non-Fiction Crown (2017).

Brotton collaborated as a curator and commentator with the artist and director of Factum Arte, Adam Lowe, in the exhibit Penelope’s Labour: Weaving Words and Images, at the Venice Biennale in 2011, and in 2019 he and map librarian Nick Millea co-curated the exhibition Talking Maps at the Bodleian Library in Oxford.

Brotton has written and presented various radio programmes for BBC Radio 3, BBC Radio 4 and the BBC World Service on historical subjects including Shakespeare, the history of the ghetto, El Dorado, ‘Blood and Bronze’ (a ten-part Radio 3 series on Benvenuto Cellini, 2021), ‘One Direction’ (a five-part Radio 4 series on the cardinal directions, 2022), and ‘We Other Tudors’ (a ten-part Radio 3 series, 2023).

== Notable works ==
- The Renaissance Bazaar: From the Silk Road to Michelangelo (Oxford: Oxford University Press, 2002. ISBN 978-0192802682)
- The Renaissance: A Very Short Introduction (Oxford: Oxford University Press, 2006. ISBN 978-0192801630)
- The Sale of the Late King's Goods: Charles I and his Art Collection (London: Pan Macmillan, 2006. ISBN 978-1509865277)
- A History of the World in Twelve Maps (London: Allen Lane, 2012. ISBN 978-1846140990)
- Great Maps: The World's Masterpieces Explored and Explained (London: Dorling Kindersley, 2014. ISBN 978-1409345718
- This Orient Isle: Elizabethan England and the Islamic World (London: Allen Lane, 2016. ISBN 978-0241004029)
- The Sultan and the Queen: The Untold Story of Elizabeth and Islam (London: Viking, 2018. ISBN 978-0525428824)
- Trading Territories: Mapping the Early Modern World (London: Reaktion Books, 2018. ISBN 978-1780239293)
- (co-author with Nick Millea) Talking Maps (Oxford: The Bodleian Library, 2019. ISBN 978-1851245154
- Four Points of the Compass: The Unexpected History of Direction (New York: Atlantic Monthly Press, 2024. ISBN 978-0802163684)
