= Welsh Church of Central London =

Coordinates: 51.5167°N 0.1386°W

The Welsh Church of Central London
- The Welsh Church of Central London
- The Welsh Baptist Chapel
- Eglwys Gymraeg Canol Llundain
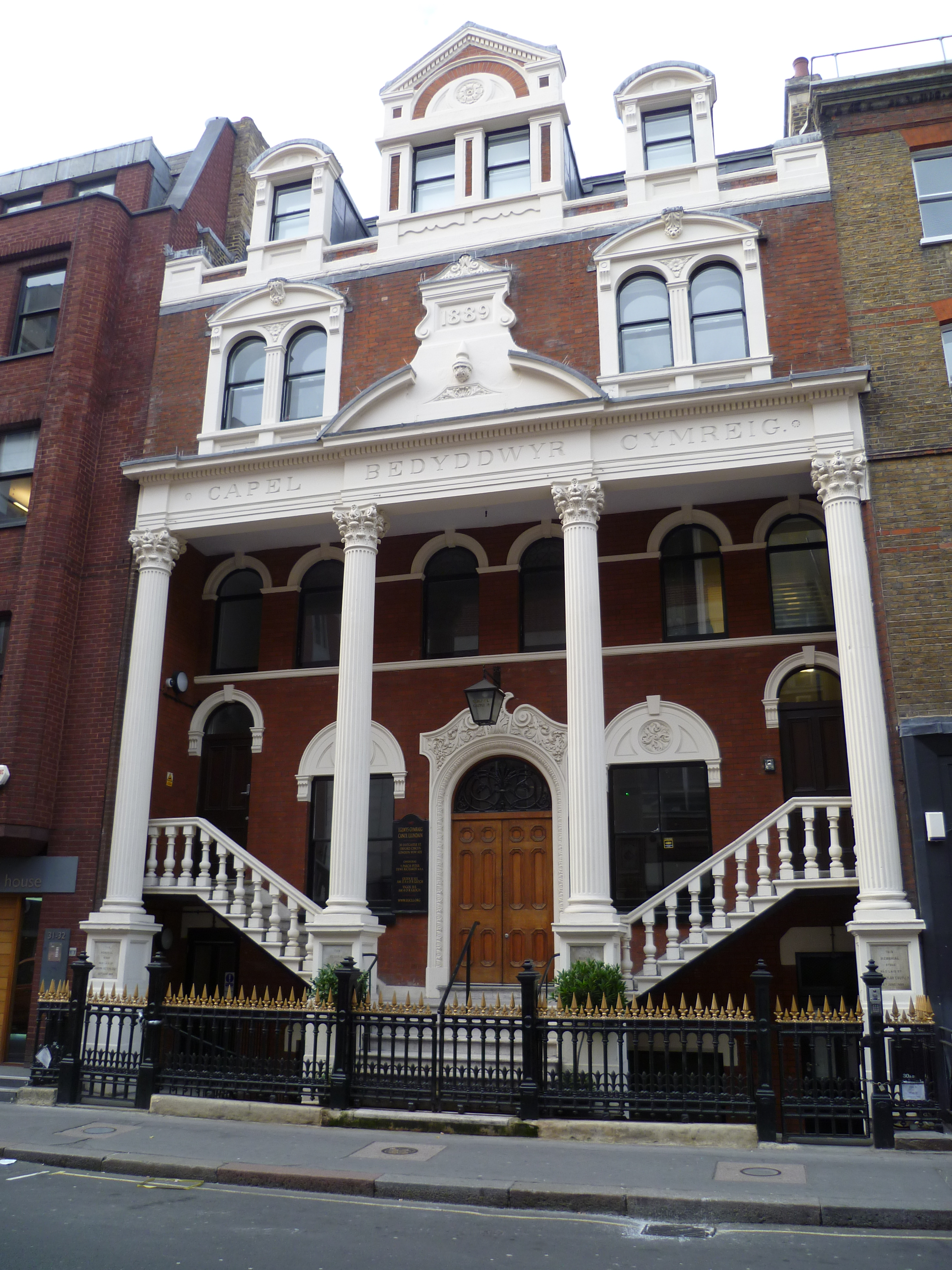
- The Welsh Church of Central London
- Denomination: Baptist
- Website: www.egcll.org

History
- Status: active

Architecture
- Heritage designation: Grade II
- Designated: 1987
- Architect: Owen Lewis
- Years built: 1888
- Completed: 1889

The Welsh Church of Central London (Welsh: Eglwys Gymraeg Canol Llundain, EGCLL), also known as The Welsh Baptist Chapel, is a Welsh Baptist church in Eastcastle Street, in the City of Westminster, London, England. The church building is a grade II listed building with Historic England on the National Heritage List for England. It currently performs Baptist services bilingually in English and in Welsh as well as hosting concerts following a merger of the Welsh Baptist church with two nearby Independent churches in 2006.

== History ==
In the 1880s, a large number of Welsh people came to London to work. As the Welsh population rose, churches were set up to minister to them. In 1888, the Welsh Church of Central London, then the Welsh Baptist Chapel, was constructed as a place where Welsh Baptists could worship in services in the Welsh language in London. When it was first opened, it was described in the Baptist Magazine as a "church of a most aggressive character, doing a grand work amongst young people". Quickly it was determined that the original building was too small to accommodate the number of those who wished to worship in the chapel. Later in the year, Owen Lewis expanded the building into its more recognisable shape. Lewis' designs for the church were praised, with a mention in the national Baptist magazine stating "it is an edifice worthy of a West-End reputation". The praise continued into modern times with the London Guide calling it a "highly imaginative Welsh Baptist chapel". Future Prime Minister of the United Kingdom, David Lloyd George was a regular attendee of the church and his daughter Olwen Lloyd George was married there in 1917.

Following the Second World War, there was a decline in Welsh speakers coming to reside in London, while changing social attitudes and the rise of mass popular culture and mass media led to a decline in the usage of the Welsh language in the London Welsh community. The Welsh Church of Central London is one of only seven Welsh chapels in London that continue to perform services in Welsh and minister to the London Welsh communities. In 2006, the Welsh Baptist Church merged with two independent churches from King's Cross and Radnor Walk to form the unified "Eglwys Gymraeg Canol Llundain". The Welsh Church of Central London has also been used to host musical concerts as well as Baptist services.

== Fixtures ==
The church was built with a red brick Eclectic Classical façade. On the front of the church, there is inscribed in Welsh CAPEL BEDYDDWYR CYMREIG (Welsh Baptist Chapel). The church has two staircases leading into the nave of the church with iron supported galleries around three sides of the interior. Above the central eastern pulpit, retained from before Lewis' renovations, is the church's organ. When it was installed in the church, the ceiling above it had to be cut away to allow for the installation and heightening of the organ pipes. The Welsh Church of Central London building was granted grade II listed status by English Heritage in 1987.
