= Fylgja =

Supernatural being or creature in Norse mythology

In Nordic folklore and mythology, a fylgja (Old Norse: [ˈfylɡjɑ], Old Swedish: fylghia, older Dalecarlian: fylgja) is a supernatural being or spirit which accompanies a person in connection to their fate or fortune. They can appear to people in their sleep as dream-women, or appear to them while awake, often in the disembodied spiritual form of an enemy.

== Etymology ==
The word fylgja means "to accompany". The term fylgja is typically translated into English as "fetch", a similar being from Irish folklore.

The term fylgja also has the meaning of "afterbirth, caul", and it has been argued by Gabriel Turville-Petre (cf. § Placenta origins) that the concept of the supernatural fylgja cannot be completely dissociated from this secondary meaning; in fact, there may well be a connection to the hamr, referring to the skin used by shapeshifters (hamramr, cf. fjaðrhamr).

== Description ==
The fylgja is a ghost who associates with (or, for lack of a better word, stalks or shadows) a particular individual, and may be characterized as a "guardian spirit". However, contrary to its name meaning 'follower', it generally moves ahead of its host, making a kind of "contact" with the person before they arrive at some key spot. The fylgja will, however, follow a person when they are near death.

A fylgja is sometimes associated with a particular family or clan, in which case it is called an ættarfylgja (pl. ættarfylgjur 'family followers'). A closely related type of fylgja is the "dream woman", as appears in Gísla saga (Cf. § Sleep and dreams below). It is contended that the Icelandic mar or mara (the folkloric "[night]mare") is a dream fylgja which has strayed from its assigned host and visiting the dreams of others, which tend to be more sinister than when visiting its usual host or ward.

The fylgja is said to take on either an animal form or a female human form, and this is due to a conflation of two distinct types of spirits, according to Else Mundal; the term fylgja, she argues, was first associated with the animal spirit, then later applied to the woman-spirit type.

=== Placenta origins ===
The Icelandic word fylgja can also mean "placenta" or "afterbirth of a child" and the folkloric supernatural connection made between child and afterbirth may be the origins of the fylgja as a concept. According to some, the fylgja takes on the form of whatever animal that first showed itself and consumed the newborn baby's afterbirths; these creatures taking on such forms as mice, sheep, dogs, foxes, cats, and raptors, birds of prey, or carrion eaters.

=== Animal forms ===
Thus, while the fylgja usually was a female ghost in the shape of a woman, it sometimes took on the shape of animals (also female animals according to Mundal (Note: Cf. the example of the vixen representing a wizard in the Hávarðar saga Ísfirðings example below.)). The animal fylgjur typically came in the form of a dog, but also as various other land or even sea creatures.

The particular animal type that the fylgja takes on may reflect the character of the person it represents, akin to a totem animal. Hence fox-like fylgjur shadowed deceitful people, swan-like forms shadowed beautiful women. Men who were viewed as a leader would often have a fylgja displaying their "true" character. This means that if they had a "tame nature", their fylgja would typically be an ox, goat, or boar, and if they had an "untame nature", they would have a fylgja in the shape of an animal such as a fox, wolf, deer, bear, eagle, falcon, leopard, lion, or serpent.

The animal fylgja is also said to appear in front of its owner, often in dreams, and offer portents of events to come. As such it is a representation of the future itself, not the character of a person. Like a person's fate, the fylgja is not changeable, nor can it improve or act on its own.

Fylgjur may also "mark transformations between human and animal" or, in other words, they may be shape shifters. In Egil's Saga, there are references to both Egil and Skallagrim transforming into wolves or bears, and there are examples of shape shifting in the Saga of King Hrolf Kraki, where Bodvar Bjarki turns into a bear during a battle as a last stand. These transformations are possibly implied in the saga descriptions of berserkers who transform into animals or display bestial abilities.

Else Mundal has argued that the animal fylgja and the woman-ghost type fylgja are of different origins, and the solitary animal fylgja is actually that individual's alter ego present since birth, which perishes together when that person dies. (Note: Mundal (1974), reviewed in English by Brønner.)

== Occurrences ==
Fylgjur usually appear in the form of an animal or a human and commonly appear during sleep, but the sagas relate that they could appear while a person is awake as well, and that seeing one's fylgja is an omen of one's impending death. When fylgjur appear in the form of women, they are then supposedly guardian spirits for people or clans (ættir). According to Else Mundal, the female fylgja could also be considered a dís, a ghost or goddess that is attached to fate.

=== Sleep and dreams ===
Fylgjur commonly appear during sleep.

In Gísla saga, the title hero Gísla Surrson is visited upon by two beautiful fylgjur, one bearing good omen, and the other one ill-boding and trying to edge him towards violence. These two are dream-women (draumkona), as already described, and mentioned as an example of Norse fetches by several authorities. These two women could represent the women ancestors of Gisli's family ties, such as the ties between his wife Aud and his sister Thordis, relating to the idea of the Hamingja and Dís. The good 'dream-woman' and the bad here are also difficult to distinguish from the dísir according to Carolyne Larrington. (Note: Jón Árnason's introduction to the "Fylgjur" section notes that the fylgja is also called dís, citing Fornmanna sögur II: 195.)

It is hardly surprising in medieval context that a dream message should have prognosticating context, giving warning about the person's fate. Both Andy Orchard and Rudolf Simek note parallels between the concept of the female guardian hamingja—a personification of a family's or individual's fortune—and the fylgja.

In another saga example, Atli of Otradalr dreams of a vixen leading a pack of 18 wolves. The ensuing attack was led by the "most wicked wizard in the whole of the region" (Hávarðar saga Ísfirðings, i.e. "Saga of Hávarður of Ísafjörður"). This is a fylgja or fetch example discussed by G. Turville-Petre, etc.

A rare or even uniquely surviving case of the horse-fylgja occurs in Vatnsdæla saga. Here, the dreamer (Ingólfr Þorsteinsson) sees himself riding on a red horse, which he optimistically regards as a good portent. But his wife disagrees, and explains the horse to be a marr (mentioned above, ≈nightmare, mare), and is a man's fetch, furthermore, the red color betrays bloody-mindedness. She unsuccessfully tries to dissuade him from attending the meeting to select the chieftain (goði), and though Ingólfr is elected, he is immediately killed by an assassinator.

=== Waking appearances ===
The sagas also relate that they could appear while a person is awake as well, and that seeing one's fylgja is an omen of one's impending death.

Thus in Hallfreðar saga, its protagonist Hallfreðr vandræðaskáld ("the troublesome-poet") had a vision of a woman clad in armour whom he recognized to be his own fylgjukona and he perceived that her appearance signified his imminent death aboard the ship.

== Folktales ==
=== Skotta and móri ===
In Jón Árnason's classification, he placed the "fylgja" branch of stories under the broader class of "draugr" ("ghost" or "goblin stories"); and under this "fylgja" branch (fylgjur or "followers") he collected many stories of ghosts which were of the female skotta and male móri types. However, modern commentators have distinguished the móri and the skotta as wicked ghosts, which are separate from the fylgja. (Note: Dempsey (2017), p. 28 quoting Swatos & Gissurarson (1997), p. 48)

The name skotta is explained from their odd habit of wearing the faldur, the woman's headdress Icelandic national costume: instead of wearing it curved forward as she is supposed to, she wears a brown-red (Note: Icelandic: mórauð) faldur curled backward like a tail (skott, "tail"). She also wears red stockings and sucks her fingers, but, otherwise, she is dressed properly and conducts herself normally.

Just as the skotta favored wearing a brown[ish] faldur, the male móri were also characterized by their wearing brown (mór) clothing, hence this particular appellation. Though the móri was also known by other names such as lalli, or goggur or by other kennings.

== See also ==
- Anima and animus
- Augoeides
- Daemon
- Dís
- Familiar spirit
- Fetch (folklore)
- Luonto
- Norns
- Totem
- Valkyrie
- Vörðr

== Bibliography ==
- Jón Árnason (1862). "2. Flokkur Draguasögur / 3. Grein. Fylgjur". Íslenzkar Þjóðsögur og Æfintýri. Vol. 1. Leipzig: J. C. Hinrichs. pp. 354–404.
- Jón Árnason (1866). Icelandic Legends Collected by Jón Árnason. Translated by George E. J. Powell; Eiríkr Magnússon. London: Longman, Green, and Co. pp. lxxxix–xc.
- Kelchner, Georgia Dunham (1935), Dreams in Old Norse Literature and their Affinites in Folklore, Cambridge University Press
- Mundal, Else (1974), Fylgjemotiva i norrøn litteratur (in Norwegian), Oslo: Universitetsforlaget
