= Eiríkur Magnússon =

Icelandic scholar and translator (1833–1913)

Eiríkr Magnússon
- Born: February 1, 1833; Iceland
- Died: January 24, 1913 (aged 79)
- Occupations: scholar, philologist, translator and librarian

Eiríkr or Eiríkur Magnússon (1 February 1833 – 24 January 1913) was an Icelandic scholar at the University of Cambridge, who taught Old Norse to William Morris, translated numerous Icelandic sagas into English in collaboration with him, and played an important role in the movement to study the history and literature of the Norsemen in Victorian England.

== Biography ==
Born in Berufjörður in the east of Iceland, Eiríkr was sent to England in 1862 by the Icelandic Bible Society, and his first translations there were of mediaeval Christian texts.

In 1871, with the assistance of Sir Henry Holland, 1st Baronet and of Alexander Beresford Hope, MP for Cambridge, he became an under-librarian at the Cambridge University Library, where he worked until the end of 1909. In 1893 he also became lecturer in Icelandic.

Eiríkr lectured and organised famine relief for Iceland in 1875 and 1882 and fell out with Guðbrandur Vigfússon, a fellow Icelandic scholar who was at Oxford and had been his friend, over that and his preference for modernised Icelandic in translating the Bible; Guðbrandur was a purist.

Like many Icelandic scholars in Britain at the time, Eiríkr gave Icelandic lessons as a source of income; his first pupil was probably Sir Edmund Walker Head, 8th Baronet in 1863, and he taught some by post. Another was George E. J. Powell, who had supported him financially when he first came to England and with whom he translated Jón Arnason's Icelandic folktales and worked on a translation of Hávarðar saga Ísfirðings that remained unpublished.

Most famously, he taught William Morris and collaborated with him on translating a number of sagas. Within a year of Morris beginning his studies with Eiríkr, their Story of Grettir the Strong was published (1869). In 1870 they published the first English translation of Völsungasaga. In 1871 Eiríkr and his wife accompanied Morris to Iceland, where Eiríkr went with Morris on a tour of "saga steads" and other places of interest.

Between 1891 and 1905 they published a six-volume Saga Library, which included Heimskringla and the first English translations of Hávarðar saga Ísfirðings, Hænsa-Þóris saga and Eyrbyggja Saga. Eiríkr defended Morris against York Powell's criticism of his archaic style. Volume 6 of the Saga Library, volume 4 of the Heimskringla, is an index that is entirely Eiríkr's work, published in 1905 after Morris's death.

Eiríkr was married to Sigríður Einarsdóttir, a descendant of Egill Skallagrímsson. She campaigned to improve education for girls in Iceland.

He is buried in the Mill Road cemetery, Cambridge.

== Publications ==
The Saga Library series

- Morris, William; Magnússon, Eirikr, eds. (1891), The Story of Howard the Halt; The Story of the Banded Men; The Story of Hen Thorir, vol. 1
- Morris, William; Magnússon, Eirikr, eds. (1892), The Story of the Ere-Dwellers (Eyrbyggya Saga) with The Story of the Heath-Slayings (Heisarvíga Saga), vol. 2
- Morris, William; Magnússon, Eirikr, eds. (1893), "Heimskringla (Volume I)", The Stories of the Kings of Norway, vol. 3
- Morris, William; Magnússon, Eirikr, eds. (1894), "Heimskringla (Volume II)", The Stories of the Kings of Norway, vol. 4
- Morris, William; Magnússon, Eirikr, eds. (1895), "Heimskringla (Volume III)", The Stories of the Kings of Norway, vol. 5
- Magnússon, Eirikr (1905), "Heimskringla (Volume IV)", The Stories of the Kings of Norway, vol. 6

Other saga

- Morris, William; Magnússon, Eirikr; Þorgilsson, Ari, eds. (1891) [1869], The story of Gunnlaug the Worm-tongue and Raven the Skald, Chiswick Press, e-text
- Morris, William; Magnússon, Eirikr, eds. (1869), The Story of Grettir the Strong (2nd ed.), e-text
- Morris, William; Magnússon, Eirikr, eds. (1870), Völsunga Saga: The Story of the Volsungs & Niblungs with certain songs from the Elder Edda
  - Morris, William; Magnússon, Eirikr; Weston, Jessie L., eds. (1907), Volsunga Saga: The Story of the Volsungs and Niblungs, with certain songs from the Elder Edda, introduction by H. Halliday Sparling, e-text
  - Morris, William; Magnússon, Eirikr; Weston, Jessie L., eds. (1907), The Volsunga Saga [...] supplemented with Legends of the Wagner Trilogy, introduction by H. Halliday Sparling
- Morris, William; Magnússon, Eirikr, eds. (1875), The Story Of Frithiof The Bold, e-text
- Morris, William; Magnússon, Eirikr, eds. (1901) [1875], Three Northern Love Stories, and other tales; (New ed.), Gunnlaug the Worm-tongue and Raven the Skald; Frithof the Bold; Viglund the Fair; Hogni and Hedinn; Roi the Fool; Thorstein Staff-smitten
- Runeberg, Johan Ludwig; Magnússon, Eirikr, eds. (1912), King Fialar: a poem in five songs

Others

- Arnason, Jon; Powell, George E. J.; Magnússon, Eirikr, eds. (1864), Icelandic Legends, Richard Bentley, Elves; Water-Monsters; Trolls; Ghosts and Goblins; Misc.
- Arnason, Jon; Powell, George E. J.; Magnússon, Eirikr, eds. (1866), Icelandic Legends (2nd series), Richard Bentley, God and the Evil One; Paradise and Hell; Divine Punishment; Historical Legends; Outlaws; Tales; Comic Stories; Appendix
- Ásgrímsson, Eysteinn (1870), Magnússon, Eirikr (ed.), Lilja (The Lily) - an Icelandic Religious Poem of the Fourteenth Century, Williams and Norgate, as editor and translator
- Runeberg, Johan Ludwig (1878), Magnússon, Eirikr; Palmer, E.H. (eds.), Lyrical Songs Idylls and Epigrams

Journal articles

- Magnússon, Eirikr, ed. (20 Mar 1877), "On a Runic Calendar Found in Lapland in 1866", Cambridge Antiquarian Society's Communications, vol. 4, no. 1
- Magnússon, Eirikr, ed. (13 May 1878), "Description of a Norwegian Clog-Calendar", Cambridge Antiquarian Society's Communications, vol. IV
- Magnússon, Eirikr, ed. (1885), On Hávamál: Verses 2 and 3 (Bugges Edition), University Press, reprinted from Proc. Cambridge Philogical Society, October 1884, No.IX
- Magnússon, Eirikr, ed. (1906), Notes on Shipbuilding and Nautical Terms of Old in the North, W., A. Moring, paper for the Viking Club Society for Northern Research

Icelandic

- Pétursson, Pétur; Magnússon, Eirikr; Melsteð, Sigurður, eds. (1866), Hið nýa testamenti: drottins vors Jesú Krists ásamt me Davíðs Sálmum [The New Testament: Our Lord Jesus Christ, along with David's Psalms] (in Icelandic), Oxford, prentad- í Prentsmid-ju Háskólans í Oxford, á kostnadhins Brezka og Erlenda Biflíufélags
- Magnússon, Eirikr, ed. (1875), Thómas Saga Erkibyskups: A Life of Archbishop Thomas Becket, in Icelandic, with English Translation, Notes, and Glossary (in Icelandic and English), vol. I
- Magnússon, Eirikr, ed. (1883), Thómas Saga Erkibyskups: A Life of Archbishop Thomas Becket, in Icelandic, with English Translation, Notes, and Glossary (in Icelandic and English), vol. II
- Jochumsson, Matthías; Magnússon, Eirikr, eds. (1885), Minningarljód eftir Brynjólf Benediktsen og dóttur hans Ingileif Benediktsen [Remembrance of Brynjólf Benediktsen and his daughter Ingileif Benediktsen] (in Icelandic), Ísafoldarprentsmiðja
