= Nanteos Mansion =

Country house hotel in Ceredigion, Wales

Coordinates: 52.3882°N 4.0291°W

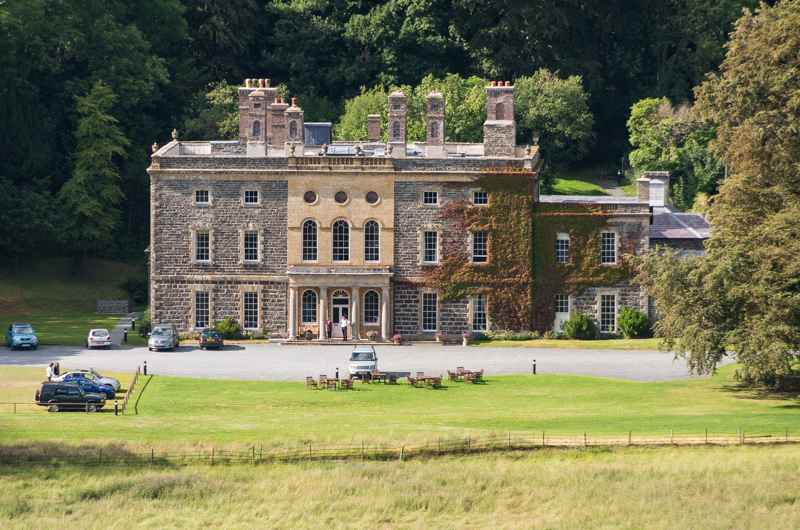
Nanteos Mansion frontage

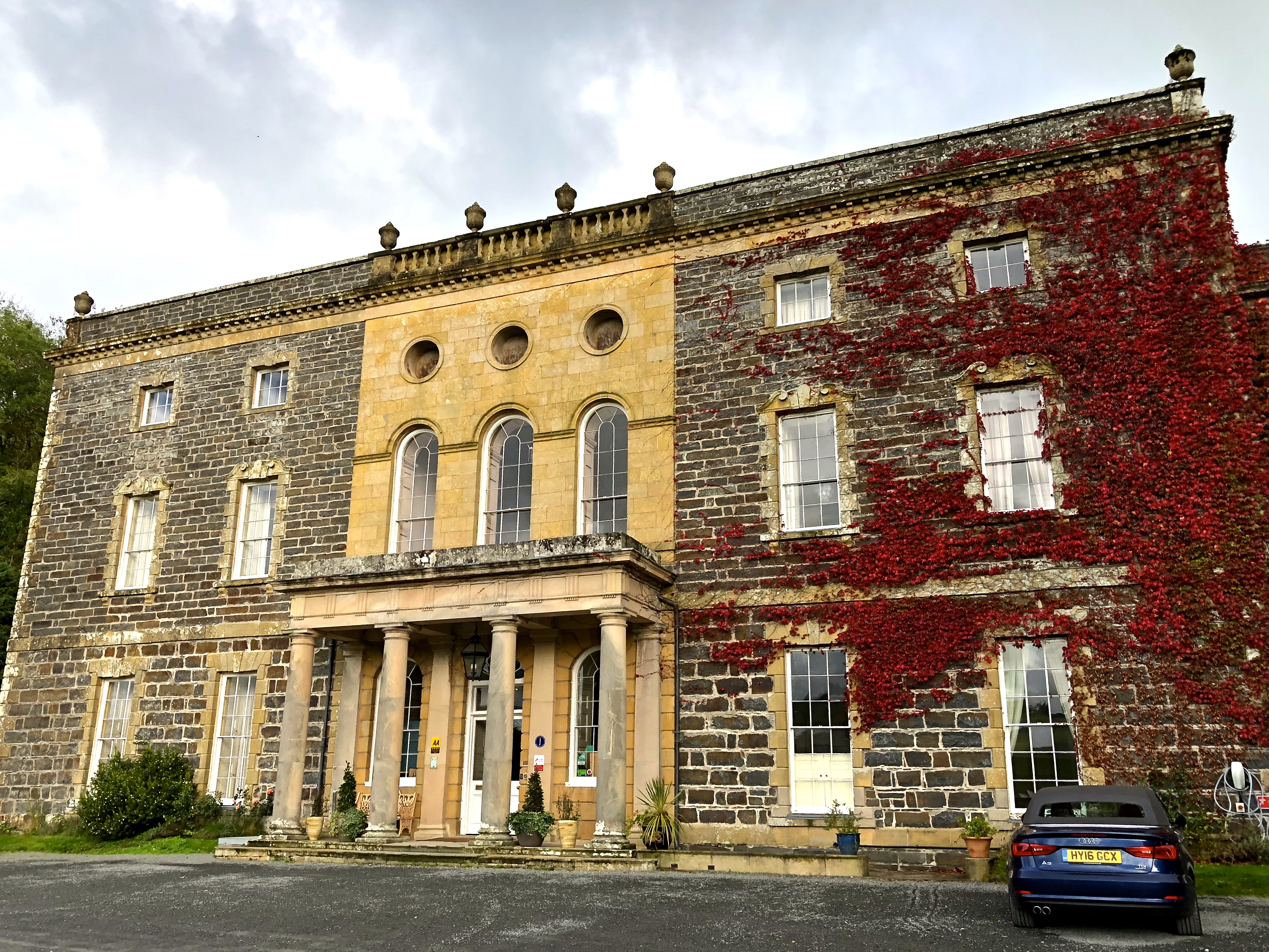
The façade of Nanteos Mansion

Nanteos (Welsh: Plas Nanteos, Nanteos Mansion) is an 18th-century former country house in Llanbadarn-y-Creuddyn, near Aberystwyth, Ceredigion, Wales. A Grade I listed building, it is now a country house hotel. The gardens and parkland surrounding the mansion are listed on the Cadw/ICOMOS Register of Parks and Gardens of Special Historic Interest in Wales.

The current building was constructed between 1738 and 1757 for the Powell family, with the Shrewsbury architect Edward Haycock Sr. designing the stable block in the 1830s, and William Ritson Coultart designing the east wing and rear offices in 1841. The family occupied the house for some 200 years up until the last of the Powells, Margaret Powell, who died in 1951. At its peak the Nanteos estate comprised some 31,000 acres in 1800, covering most of what is today Aberystwyth, and was the major employer of the county. The name derives from the Welsh for "brook" (nant) and "nightingale" (eos).

The house was once the home of the Nanteos Cup, a medieval mazer drinking bowl that has been attributed with a supernatural ability to heal those who drink from it; it was traditionally believed to be fashioned from a piece of the True Cross. A 1905 pamphlet declared it to be the Holy Grail.

== History ==
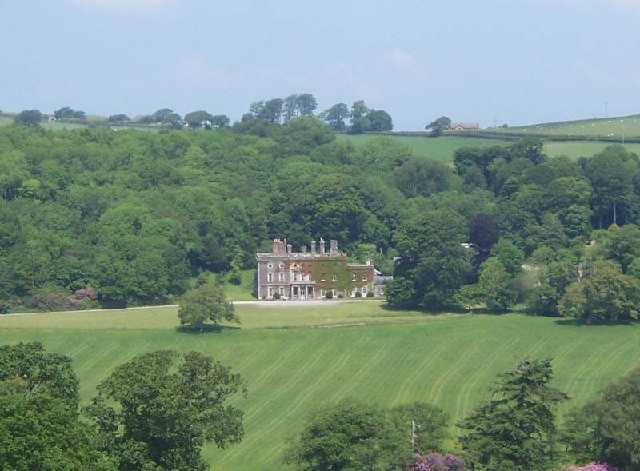
Nanteos in its grounds

The earliest recorded occupant of the estate was Colonel John Jones, a Royalist during the English Civil War and High Sheriff of Cardiganshire for 1665. He had no sons and so the estate was inherited in 1666 by his daughter Anne, who had married a Dutch mining engineer, Cornelius Le Brun, who in turn became High Sheriff in 1676. Their only daughter Averina duly inherited, having married William Powell (1658–1738) of Llechwedd Dyrus, and passed it on in 1738 to their eldest son, Thomas. Thomas had married a wealthy heiress, Mary Frederick, and started to build the present house soon afterwards. He was MP in turn for Cardigan Boroughs and Cardiganshire and died in a London street.

The property then descended in the family to the Reverend William Powell in 1752, who completed the building work. His son Thomas inherited and was High Sheriff in 1785; Thomas's son William Edward was High Sheriff in 1810 and MP for Cardiganshire between 1816 and his death in 1854. The property passed to his son William Thomas Rowland Powell, who was also MP for Cardiganshire. In 1878 the property was inherited by his son George Ernest John Powell, an antiquary and collector. The property was inherited by his nephew William Beauclerk Powell and then by his son Edward Athelstan Lewis Powell, whose son and heir William Edward George Pryse Wynne Powell was killed in the First World War.

The property passed to Edward Athelstan Lewis Powell's widow Margaret, who died in 1930. She bequeathed the property in 1951 to Mrs. Elizabeth Mirylees, a distant relative of her husband, who moved in 1956. She sold it only 11 years later to Geoff and Rose Bliss, who lived there until 1983, opening the building to the public. Since then there have been several owners, with the mansion being operated as a hotel until March 2025 hotel. In 2004 it was purchased by the Saxoncourt Group which completed a major refurbishment in 2012.

Nanteos is a Grade I listed building. The gardens and park are designated Grade II* on the Cadw/ICOMOS Register of Parks and Gardens of Special Historic Interest in Wales.

== Gallery ==
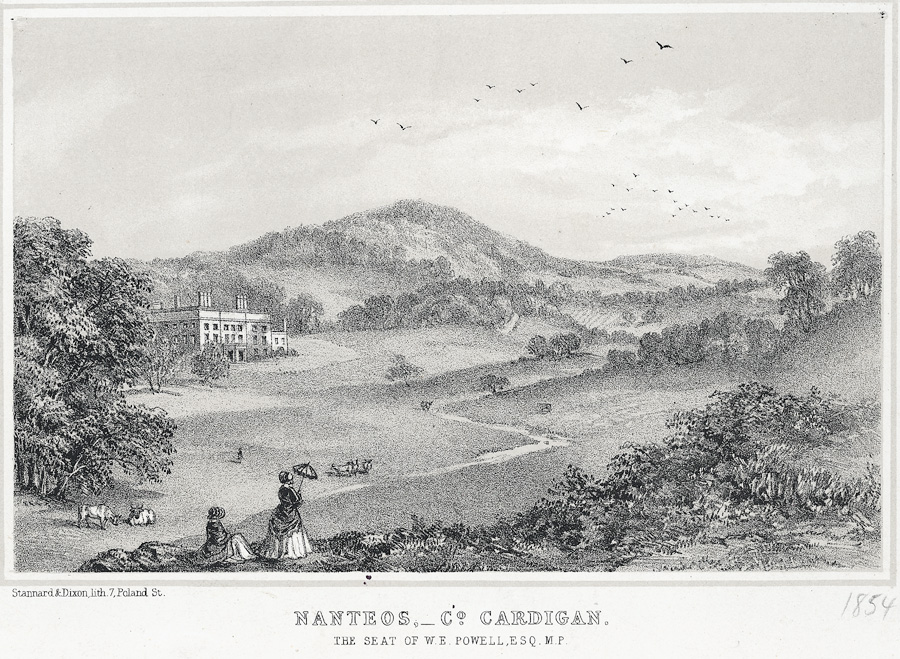
Nanteos Mansion, the seat of W. E .Powell, Esq M.P., c. 1852

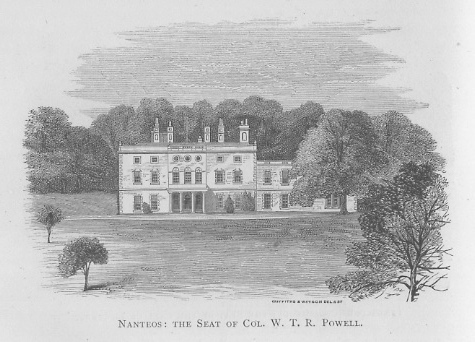
Nanteos, Ceredigion. From Nicholls, Annals and Antiquities of Wales 1872. Vol 1,130

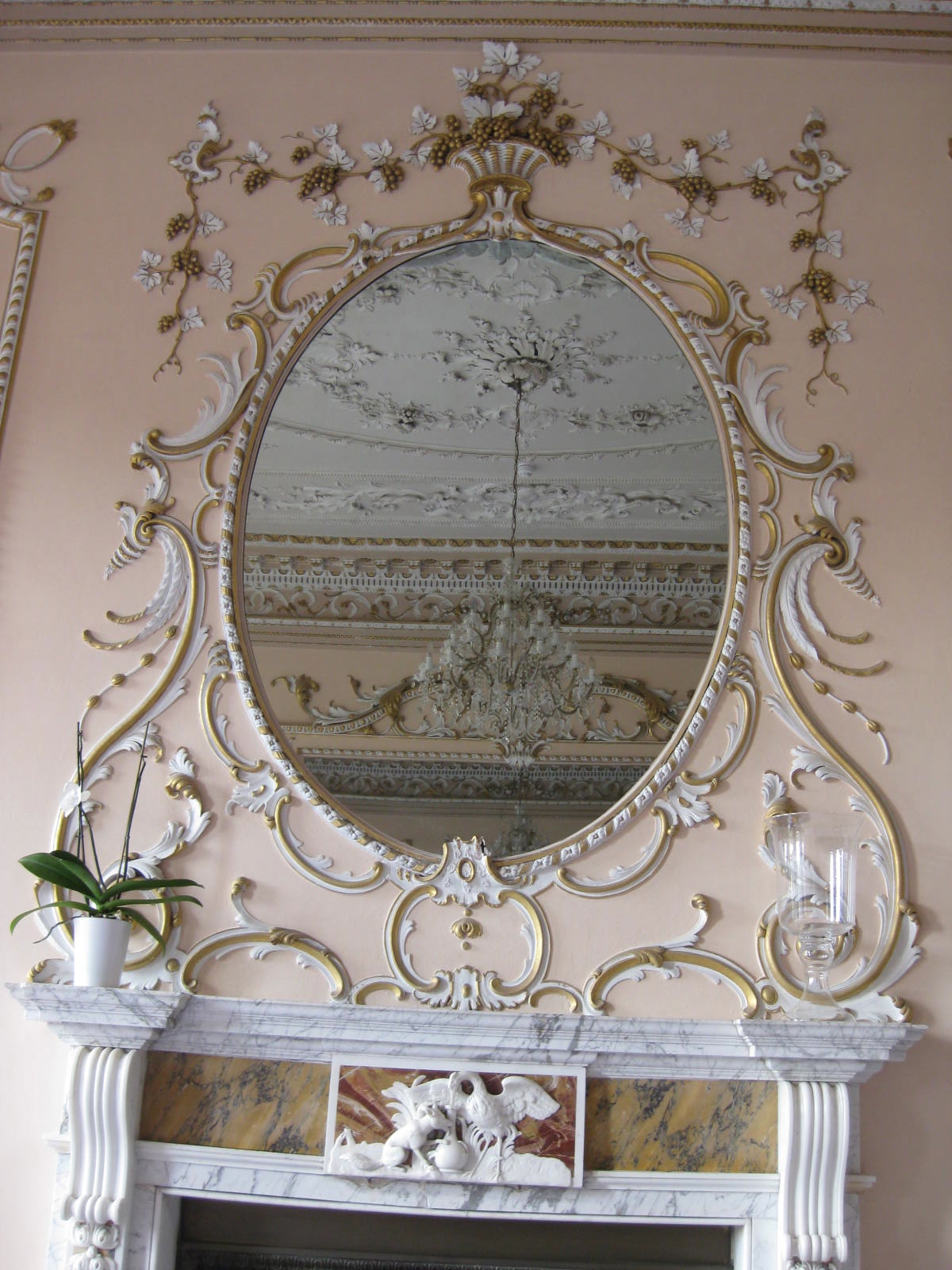
Fireplace in former music room

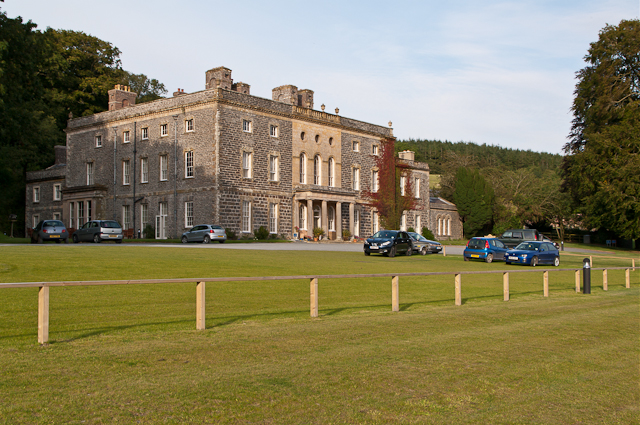
Side of house showing extension at back and bay window added by Edward Haycock

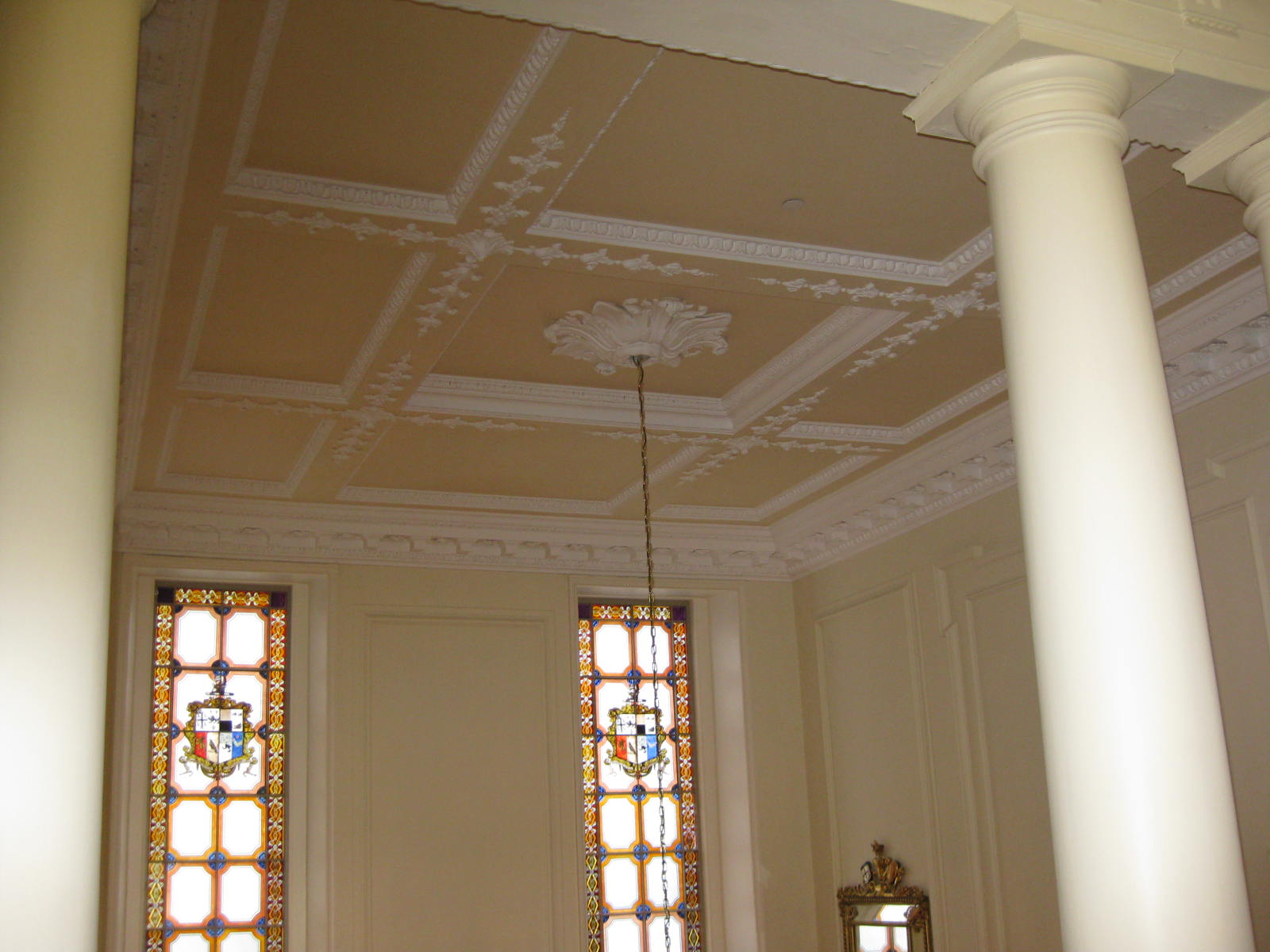
Staircase ceiling

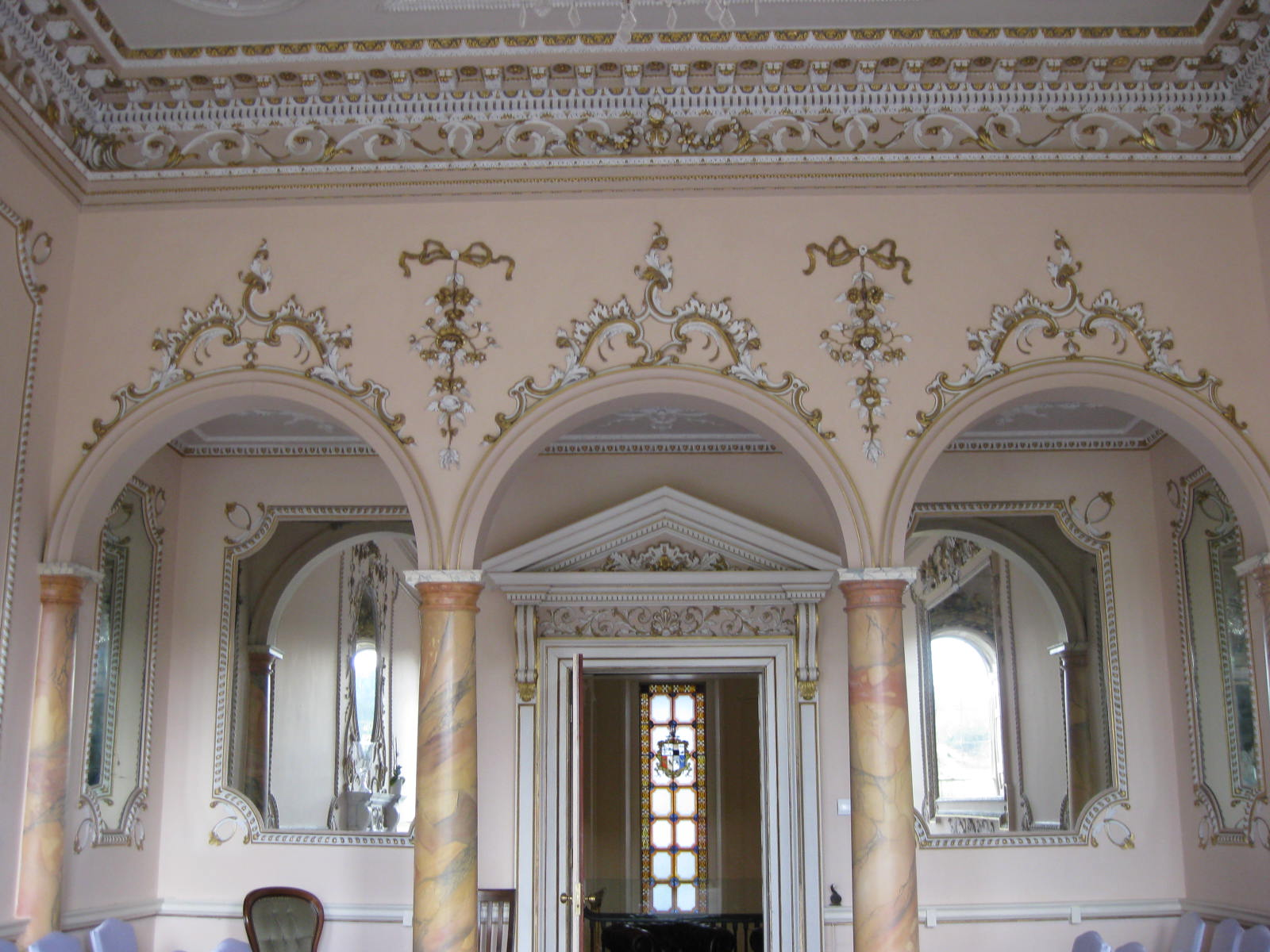
Arcade at top of stairs

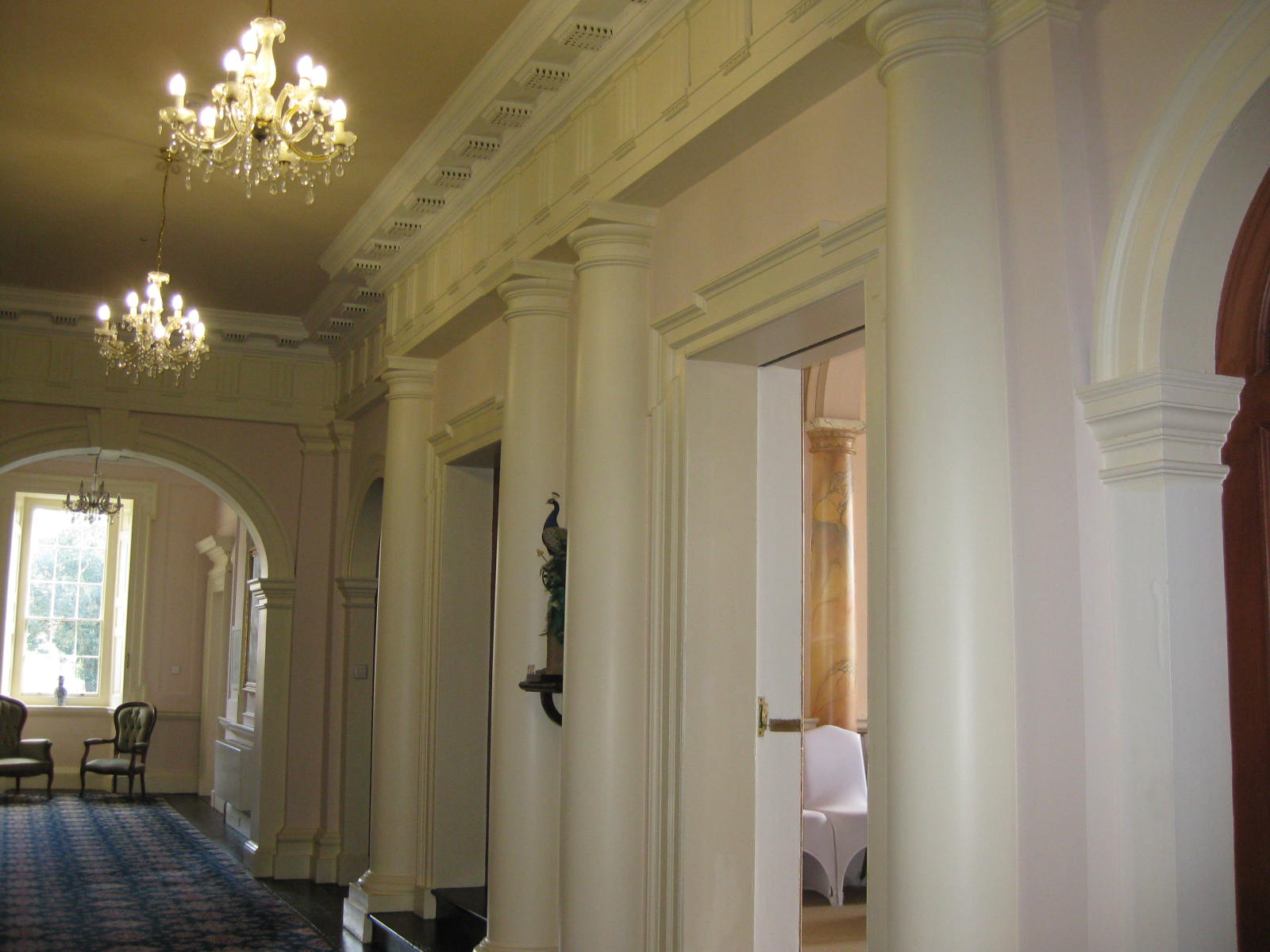
Corridor with Doric columns, probably by Edward Haycock

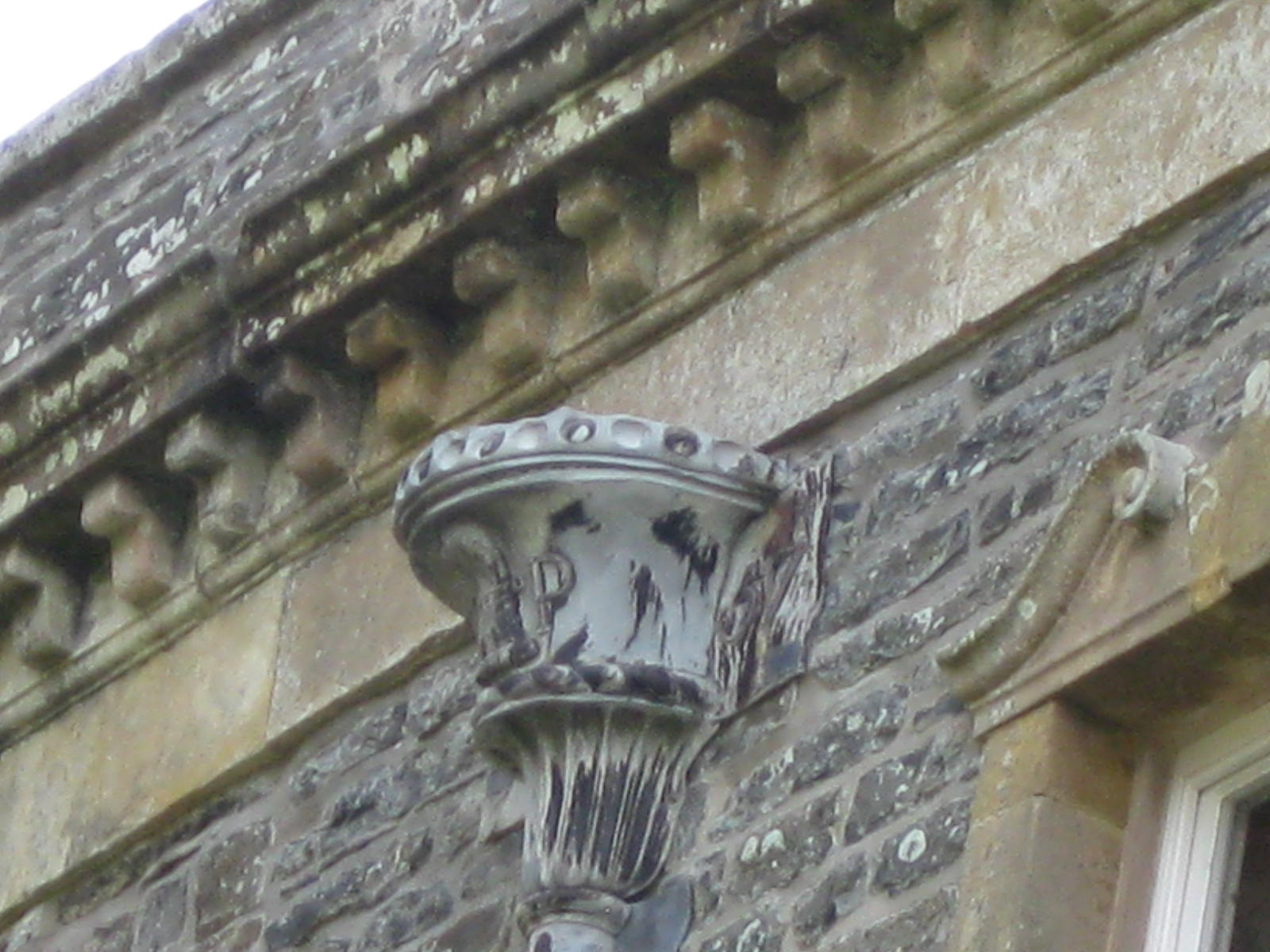
Lead rainwater head, dated 1757

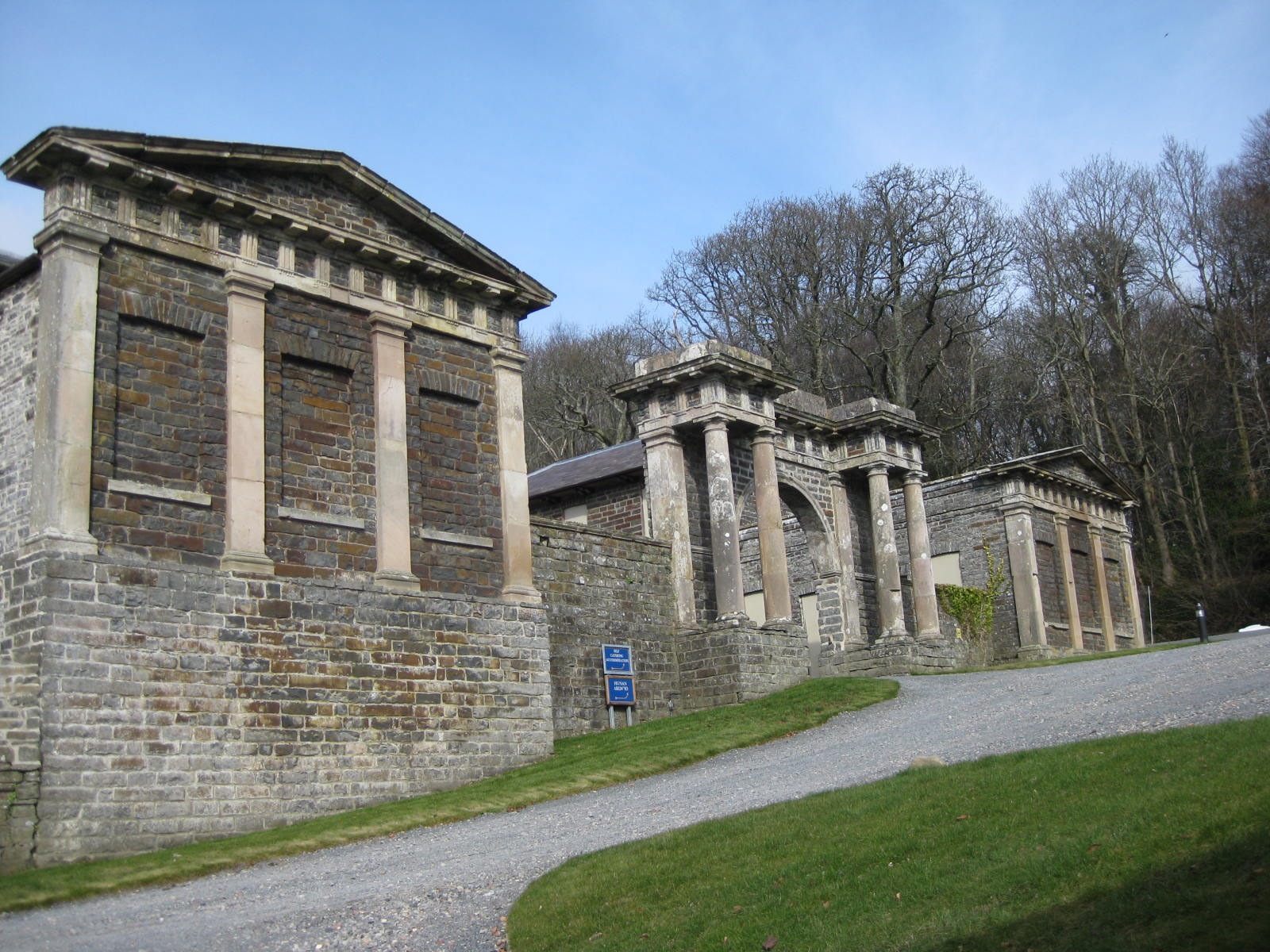
Stable block

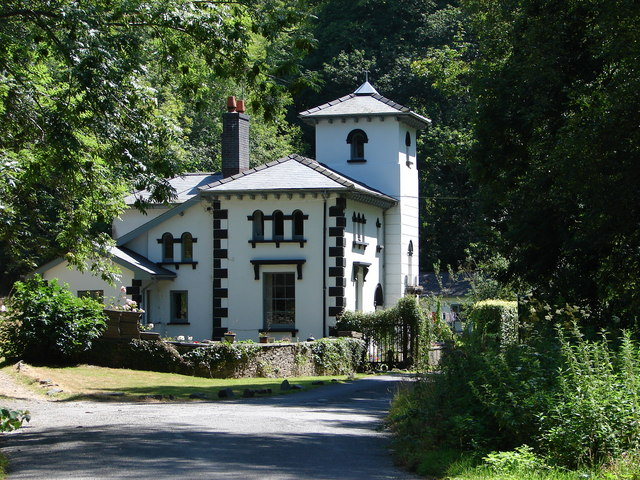
Nanteos Lodge, by the architect R. K. Penson, 1857
