= George Powell (collector) =

Welsh antiquary and collector

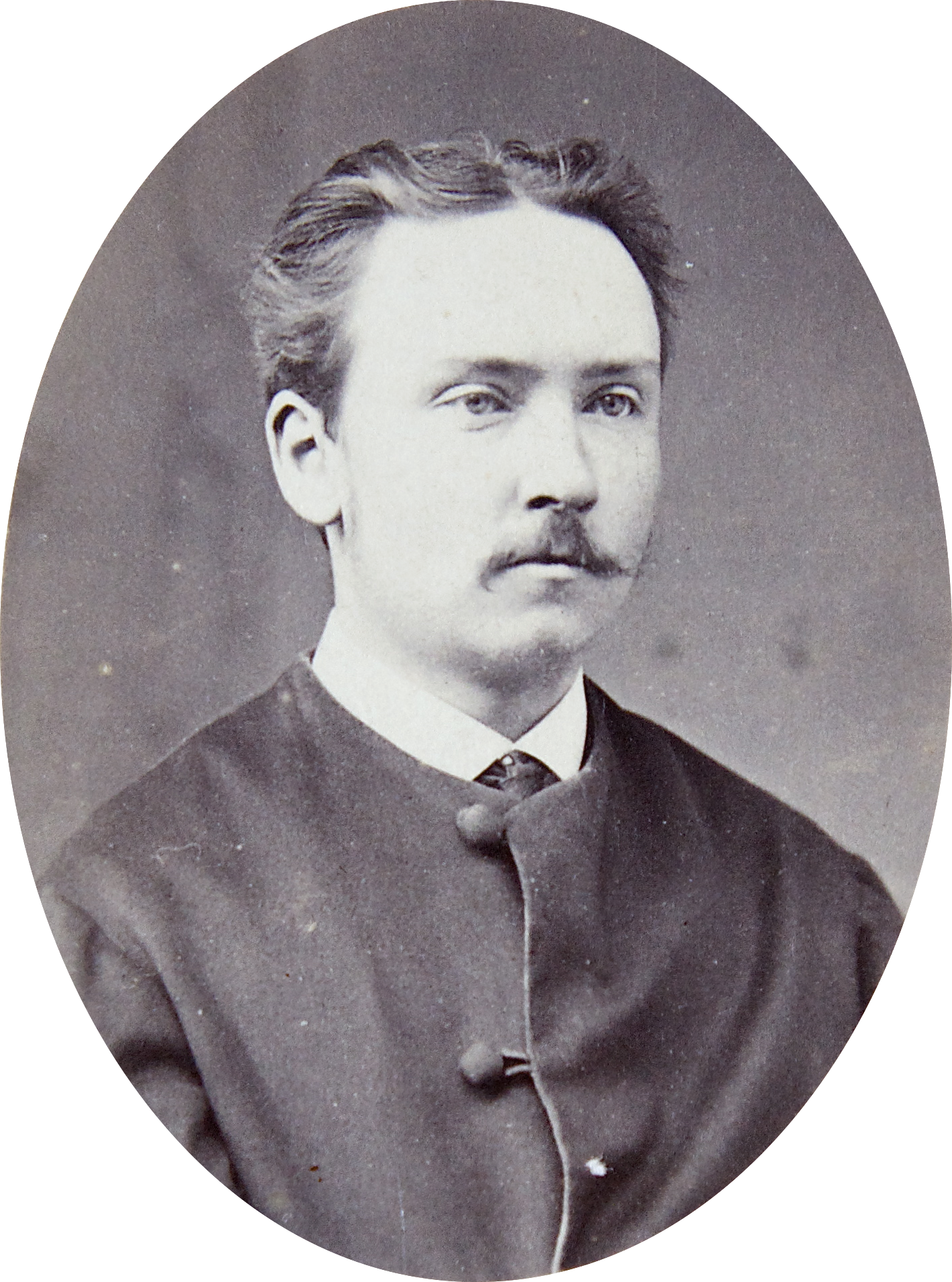
- Born: George Ernest John Powell; February 10, 1842; Cheltenham, Gloucestershire, England, UK
- Died: October 17, 1882 (aged 40); Aberystwyth, Ceredigion, Wales, UK
- Occupations: antiquary, collector and translator

George Ernest John Powell (1842–1882) was a Welsh antiquary and collector known for his association with the Nanteos Cup, a medieval wood mazer bowl. He published poetry under the penname Miölnir Nanteos (or Miôlnir Nanteos) and translated two volumes of translations of Icelandic legends with the Icelandic scholar Eiríkur Magnússon.

== Biography ==
George Ernest John Powell was born on 10 February 1842, the son of [William] Thomas Rowland Powell (1815–1878) of Nanteos near Aberystwyth, who was the MP for Cardiganshire, and his wife Rosa Edwyna. George Powell inherited the Nanteos estate on the death of his father in 1878. The "'splendid old place' was said to be a 'home'" to Powell "in all but a 'sentimental sense'".

Powell, an amateur poet in his youth, was a close friend of the poet Algernon Charles Swinburne, whom he met while studying at Brasenose College, Oxford. Swinburne had a long-held "fascination" for the Arthurian legends and was a close associate of William Morris and Dante Gabriel Rossetti, both of whom shared the same interest. Morris and Edward Burne-Jones spent "much time reading and discussing" Le Morte d'Arthur while at Oxford, and Rossetti contributed designs for woodcut illustrations to the Arthurian poems in an 1857 edition of Alfred, Lord Tennyson's work. During the summer of 1857 Morris and Rossetti took a commission to paint the upper walls and roof of the Oxford Union debating-hall with scenes from Le Morte d'Arthur.

Swinburne had first read the story of Tristan and Iseult as a child, and at Oxford, influenced by Morris, wrote a number of Arthurian poems including Queen Yseult, Lancelot and Joyeuse Garde. Following the publication of Tennyson's The Holy Grail in 1869 Swinburne "set to work in earnest on the theme of Tristram and Iseult."

Powell was also "a fanatical devotee" of German composer Richard Wagner and attended the first performance of Wagner's Der Ring des Nibelungen as a complete cycle at Bayreuth, Germany, in August 1876. In September 1876 Powell wrote to Swinburne that he had subsequently dined with Wagner and his wife Cosima.

The Nanteos Cup was first exhibited by Powell in 1878 at St David's College, Lampeter (now University of Wales, Trinity Saint David), during a meeting of the Cambrian Archaeological Society.

Powell spent most of his adult life in London and France, having "sufficient means to pursue a life of travelling – throughout Europe, northern Africa and Iceland – writing poetry and indulging his passion for both music and collecting books, music manuscripts, autograph letters, fine and decorative art, coins and 'curiosities'."

In a short fictional work, L'anglais d'Etretat, the French writer Guy de Maupassant said of Powell: "He loved the supernatural, the macabre, the tortured, the intricate and every form of derangement." Neil Holland, Senior Curator of Collections at Aberystwyth University, points out that Powell followed in "the tradition of many eccentric collectors such as Ludwig II of Bavaria and William Beckford" and "flirted with the boundaries of acceptable behaviour" although on "rather a less lavish scale."

The Powell collection was made up of many objects described by Powell as "antiquities and curiosities" and also included 150 oil paintings, watercolours, prints and drawings (among them pencil drawings by Rossetti), 1,700 books, 11 volumes of correspondents' letters, Japanese ivory carvings, as well as a casket that once held a fragment of Robert Schumann's coffin. The collection is "imbued with Powell's own slant on the world," as Holland points out, and "representative of his personal enthusiasms [with] strong significance as precious souvenirs of friends and relics of heroes"; but it includes many objects "'without provenance', 'attributed', copies or even fakes."

When Powell decided to bequeath his collection – without the Nanteos Cup – to what was then the University College of Wales in Aberystwyth, he declared it to be all he possessed of 'bigotry and virtue'. As art historian and curator Harry Heuser has pointed out, it 'is a curious turn of phrase to sum up a legacy.' Reading the bequest like a fragmented queer autobiography, Heuser concludes that what "Powell left to us was not so much an orderly, finite collection as a trail of objects that, inviting infinite questions, implore us to go in search of the man. The bequest was his – but that quest is ours to make."

Powel married Dinah T. Harries of Goodwick, Pembrokeshire, on 10 May 1881. He died without issue in 1882 following a short illness, and the estate was inherited by his father's cousin William Beauclerk Powell (1834–1911). He was buried in Llanbadarn Fawr churchyard.

== Publications ==
- Miölnir Nanteos (1860). Quod libet. Aberystwyth: J. Cox. OCLC 48037608.
- Miölnir Nanteos (1860). Poems. Aberystwyth: J. Cox.
- Miôlnir Nanteos (1861). Poems. Vol. second series. Aberystwyth: J. Cox. OCLC 1118074058.
- Arnason, Jon, ed. (1864). Icelandic Legends. Translated by Powell, George E. J.; Magnússon, Eirikr. London: Richard Bentley.
- Arnason, Jon, ed. (1866). Icelandic Legends. Vol. second series. Translated by Powell, George E. J.; Magnússon, Eirikr. London: Longmans, Green, and Co.
