= Nanteos Cup =

Medieval wood mazer bowl found in Wales

- Cwpan Nanteos
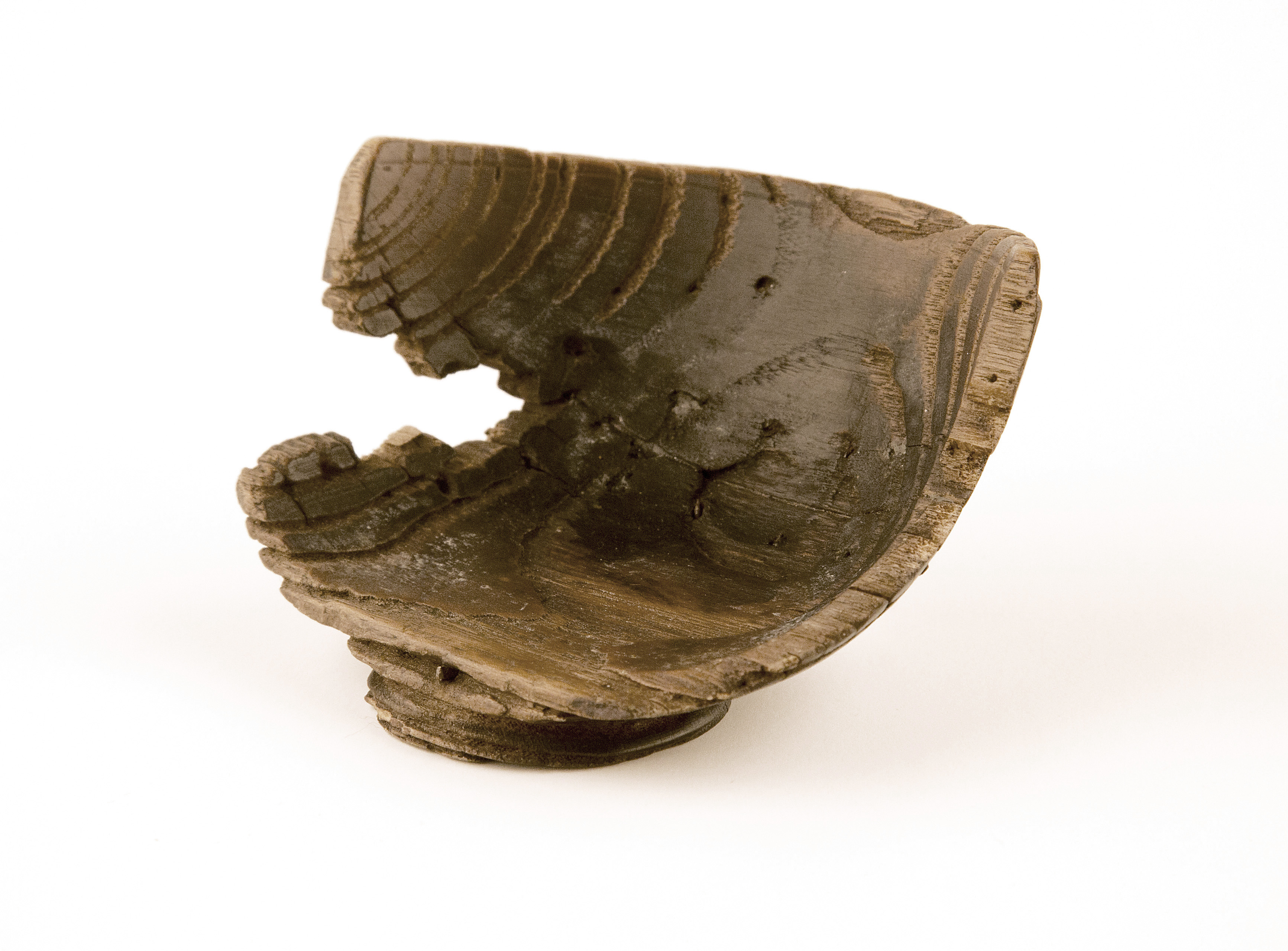
- The Nanteos Cup, photographed in 2016
- Material: Hardwood (wych elm)
- Size: ⌀ 12 cm
- Created: 14th–15th century
- Discovered: c.1878 Strata Florida Abbey, Ceredigion, Wales; 52.275104°N 3.839376°W
- Present location: National Library of Wales, Aberystwyth

The Nanteos Cup (Welsh: Cwpan Nanteos) is a medieval wood mazer bowl, held for many years at Nanteos Mansion, near Aberystwyth in Wales.

Since at least the late 19th century, it has been attributed with a supernatural ability to heal those who drink from it and traditionally believed to be fashioned from a piece of the True Cross. By the early 20th century, it had become a candidate – one of at least 200 in Europe – for the Holy Grail. Juliette Wood, a folklorist specialising in medieval folklore and Celtic mythology, has stated that there is "no credible reference" to the cup prior to the end of the 19th century and "no mention of possible connections to the Grail until 1905."

In 1977, the cup was displayed at the National Library of Wales, Aberystwyth, as part of the "Aberystwyth 1277–1977" celebrations marking the 700th anniversary of the granting of the town's charter by Edward I. Specialists from the Royal Commission on the Ancient and Historical Monuments of Wales used the opportunity to examine the cup and concluded that it dated from the Late Middle Ages and was carved from wych elm. In July 2014, it was reported that the cup had been stolen from a house in Weston under Penyard while the occupant to whom it had been loaned was in hospital. It was recovered in June 2015. Following the recovery of the cup, the owners placed it in the care of the National Library of Wales, where it went on permanent public display in June 2016.

== Description ==
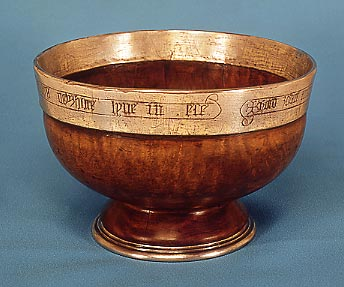
An example of a 14th-century mazer, similar in design to the Nanteos Cup. This mazer is fashioned from maplewood and retains its silver-gilt rim. Made around 1380, it is in the collection of the Victoria and Albert Museum, London

The vessel is a shallow, hardwood bowl without handles, with a broad flat foot. Originally it would have stood 10 cm in height, with a diameter of 12 cm, although it has been extensively damaged over the years and slightly less than half of the bowl remains. Unlike other examples of mazers, it has no boss or knob in the centre of the inside, and there is no evidence that one has been removed or lost due to damage. It is fashioned from hardwood, most likely wych elm, with no visible decorations. A groove which may previously have held a metal rim runs around the lip.

== First public exhibition ==
The cup was first exhibited by George E. J. Powell (1842–1882) in 1878 at St David's College, Lampeter (now a campus of University of Wales, Trinity Saint David), during a meeting of the Cambrian Archaeological Society. Powell was the son of Colonel William Powell (1815–1878), from whom he inherited the Nanteos estate in 1878.

The minutes of the meeting at which the cup was first exhibited record that George E. J. Powell introduced the object and gave an account of it being "preserved for many years past at Nanteos", having formerly been in the possession of the abbey at Strata Florida (Welsh: Ystrad Fflur, "Vale of Flowers"). The minutes also state:

It was supposed to possess healing power, which could only be called miraculous. It was sent for to the house of a sick man, and some valuable object was left as a pledge to ensure its safe return. The patient had to drink wine or some liquor out of it. Not content with this, he sometimes nibbled a piece from its edge: hence its present unshapely condition. The source of its alleged virtues were supposed to lie in its having formed a portion of the True Cross. I think there can be little doubt that so much of its pedigree is true as traces it to the possession of the Cistercians at Strata Florida. Nothing is more probable than that it was preserved in their church as a relic to which thaumaturgic powers were ascribed. The veneration accorded to it in the neighbourhood, and, still more decidedly, a regard for their own health and that of their families, would prompt the country-people to bring some pressure to bear on those who would otherwise have destroyed it, to secure this valuable relic. Probably the new lords of Strata Florida had some belief in its efficacy. If this account of the matter is true, the relic is extremely interesting, as an example of the survival of medieval belief, and even of medieval practice, down to our own day, in a country in which the popular religious sentiments are certainly not tinged with medievalism.

The cup was correctly identified and subsequently catalogued by the Society as a wooden mazer dating from the Middle Ages. A drawing made around the same time by Worthington George Smith shows the cup in the same damaged condition as it exists today, held together with 2 metal staples. Wood found that prior to 1878 "evidence for a relic at Nanteos [was] lacking" and that it had not appeared in Samuel Rush Meyrick's survey, published as The History and Antiquities of the County of Cardiganshire, in 1809. Wood also noted that Worthington G. Smith had made sketches of archaeological excavations at Strata Florida Abbey and suggested that the cup may actually have been found during those excavations. Powell was known to have had repairs carried out to make the unstable abbey ruins safe and the appearance of the Nanteos Cup "coincided quite closely" with these repairs. Richard Barber, a historian specialising in Arthurian legends, has also proposed that the cup was probably discovered at the site of the abbey in the 19th century. John Thomas Evans, in his The Church Plate of Cardiganshire (1914), suggested that the cup may have been passed to the Powell family from the Stedman family, who owned the Strata Florida estate, when Richard Stedman died in 1746:

At this time, no doubt, the Powell family came into possession of what is now known as "The Tregaron Healing Cup", or "The Nanteos Healing Cup". Sir S. R. Meyrick does not mention it in his Hist of Cardiganshire (1810), nor, as far as I am aware, do any of the innumerable English tourists, but extraordinary tales have been told (since about 1836) of the healing powers supposed to be possessed by this fragment of what is probably an ancient Mazer Bowl.

Wood points out that there is no record of the cup in any will or inventory of the Stedman or Powell families. The cup received wider attention over the following two decades. In 1890, the North Wales Chronicle newspaper mentioned the cup on its Notices page, reproducing the same details that had been reported in Archaeologia Cambrensis in 1878. By 1895, more details had been added to the cup's legend, and the Western Mail reported:

The cup is of wood, traditionally supposed to have been formed from a piece of the true Cross. Who made it is not known, or how it came into the possession of the ancient family of Nanteos – the Powells. Its healing virtues in certain cases of female disorder were in great repute, and when all hopes from doctors had been given up the sufferer had only to take all nourishment, wet and dry, out of it for a few days to ensure a complete cure.

The introduction of a connection with "certain cases of female disorder" coincided with the introduction of sexualized imagery in Wagner's Parsifal, which for the first time associated the Holy Grail directly with the womb and female fertility. The revival of interest in the Arthurian legends and the Grail had been bolstered by the Victorian poet Alfred, Lord Tennyson who retold the legends in the Idylls of the King, published between 1856 and 1885. This was followed by J. M. Dent's illustrated edition of Sir Thomas Malory's Le Morte d'Arthur, issued in 12 parts between 1893 and 1894.

== Association with the Holy Grail ==
Nanteos Mansion

=== Sought and Found: A story of the Holy Grail ===
By 1901, George Eyre Evans, a local historian and antiquarian, had become concerned about the preservation of the ruins at Strata Florida. He set out to promote and "raise the public profile" of the site and organised a number of tours. In the summer of 1901 Evans led a guided tour of Strata Florida for the Chautauqua movement's summer assembly "where he spoke enchantingly on the rise, glory and fall of the abbey." He then arranged for the Chautauquans to visit Nanteos "to see the celebrated wooden healing cup." Ethelwyn Mary Amery, a member of the Chautauqua movement, subsequently declared the cup to be the Holy Grail and published a pamphlet announcing this, Sought and Found: A story of the Holy Grail, in 1905. In it she relates the story of the cup's origins, allegedly as told to her by her "hostess" at Nanteos (who at this time would have been either a very elderly Anna Maria Powell, wife of William Powell, or her daughter-in-law Margaret Powell):

Many years ago, when Henry VIII was destroying the Monasteries, his servants came into Wales, and, hearing of an ancient Monastery among the hills, where only seven old monks remained to guard their treasure, determined to destroy the Abbey and seize their goods. But the monks were warned by friendly neighbours, and fled by night, bearing their treasure with them. Their journey was long and dangerous for such old men, but they reached the House of Nant-Eos in safety, and deposited the treasure they had suffered so much to save. One by one the old monks died, and when the last one was at the point of death he entrusted the treasure to the owner of the house that had sheltered them, until the Church should once more claim its own. But the Church has not yet claimed it, and it is that treasure of the monks which you now see.

Wood reports a variation of this story in which the cup is taken by seven monks from Glastonbury to Strata Florida during the Dissolution and entrusted by the last survivor to the Stedman family. The Stedman family, however, originated from Staffordshire and "cannot be associated with the area before the seventeenth century." Similarly, the first Powell to live at Nanteos was William Powell (1658–1738) in 1705. The Dissolution of the Monasteries by Henry VIII had taken place between 1536 and 1541, over a century before the establishment of the Nanteos estate by Colonel John Jones, a Royalist during the English Civil War and High Sheriff of Cardiganshire for 1665. Strata Florida was dissolved in February 1539 and the site and most of its estates were passed to Sir Richard Devereux and his father Walter Devereux, 1st Viscount Hereford. Medieval records do not record that Strata Florida ever held a cup or bowl as a relic or that it was previously connected with Glastonbury, but both these elements became part of the Nanteos Cup legend.

Barber states that "the story of the flight from Glastonbury seems to have been deliberately invented using antiquarian accounts of the dissolution of the monasteries." Noting that "no historical evidence has ever been offered for the story" he also asserts that the "reputation" of the cup grew simply "by being repeatedly asserted." Jenkins said that Amery had been "doubtless inspired by... [George Eyre] Evans's zeal" during her visit to Nanteos, that Evans' "enthusiasm for such unique objects 'had never been known to evaporate'" and that he "clearly delighted in publicizing the remarkable properties and historical significance of the healing cup... and its association with Strata Florida."

In the years following the publication of Sought and Found, Evans "increasingly wielded a powerful influence over developments at Strata Florida" and the cup and its association with the Grail played an important part in generating the public interest necessary to ensure the remains of the abbey were "properly preserved and excavated more intensively." On 23 June 1909, Evans held an event at Strata Florida advertised as "A Day at the Abbey ('The Westminster of Wales')", which was attended by 350 people despite heavy rain. The event consisted largely of "lengthy addresses" by Rev. J. Francis Lloyd, Evans and Edmund Tyrrell Green but the main attraction was the cup. Jenkins reports:

[T]he mood lightened considerably when the legendary Nanteos cup worked its magic once more. Evans had persuaded the Powell family of Nanteos to exhibit the Cup at the event and, to great astonishment and delight, when it was removed from its case and laid on a table in full public view a brilliant ray of sunshine broke through the clouds and the rain stopped.

== In culture ==
Gerald Morgan describes a claim made in the 1960s guide to the Nanteos Mansion that German composer Richard Wagner stayed at Nanteos and was said to have been intrigued by the legend, which eventually inspired him to compose the Grail opera Parsifal. However, although the artistic dilettante George E. J. Powell probably met Wagner, there is no record of him visiting Nanteos.

The cup was included in the documentary The Search for the Holy Grail: The True Story, broadcast by Channel 5. In the programme they concluded that the wood the cup is made from dates from at least 1400 years after the crucifixion. The Commissioner for Monuments in Wales examined the piece and said it was exactly the right size and shape to be a mazer bowl, a type of medieval vessel, that it was wych elm and was from the 14th century. Similarly, in a 1998 BBC/TLC/Time-Life Television documentary Juliette Wood of the Folklore Society confirmed that the cup was a wych elm mazer or food bowl, and not made of olive wood. For a BBC Four documentary The Making of King Arthur, Simon Armitage interviewed the cup's current owner, Fiona Mirylees, and examined the cup.

== Theft ==
In July 2014, the cup became the object of renewed media interest after it was reported stolen from a house in Weston under Penyard, Herefordshire. The cup had been loaned to "a seriously ill woman with connections to the family [that owned it]", and was believed to have been stolen while the woman was in hospital. A spokeswoman for West Mercia Police said: "I don't want to say we are hunting the Holy Grail, but police are investigating the burglary." Following intelligence that the cup had been sighted, police raided the Crown Inn pub at Lea, Herefordshire. The only item found that vaguely resembled the Nanteos Cup was a salad bowl. A £2000 reward was offered for the safe return of the cup. It was recovered on 19 June 2015 – as part of Operation Icarus – following an appeal on BBC One's Crimewatch Roadshow. West Mercia Police gave few details of the recovery except to say that they were contacted by an anonymous source and the cup was subsequently "handed to officers 'on neutral ground' in a pre-arranged meeting". No arrests were made.

== Gallery ==
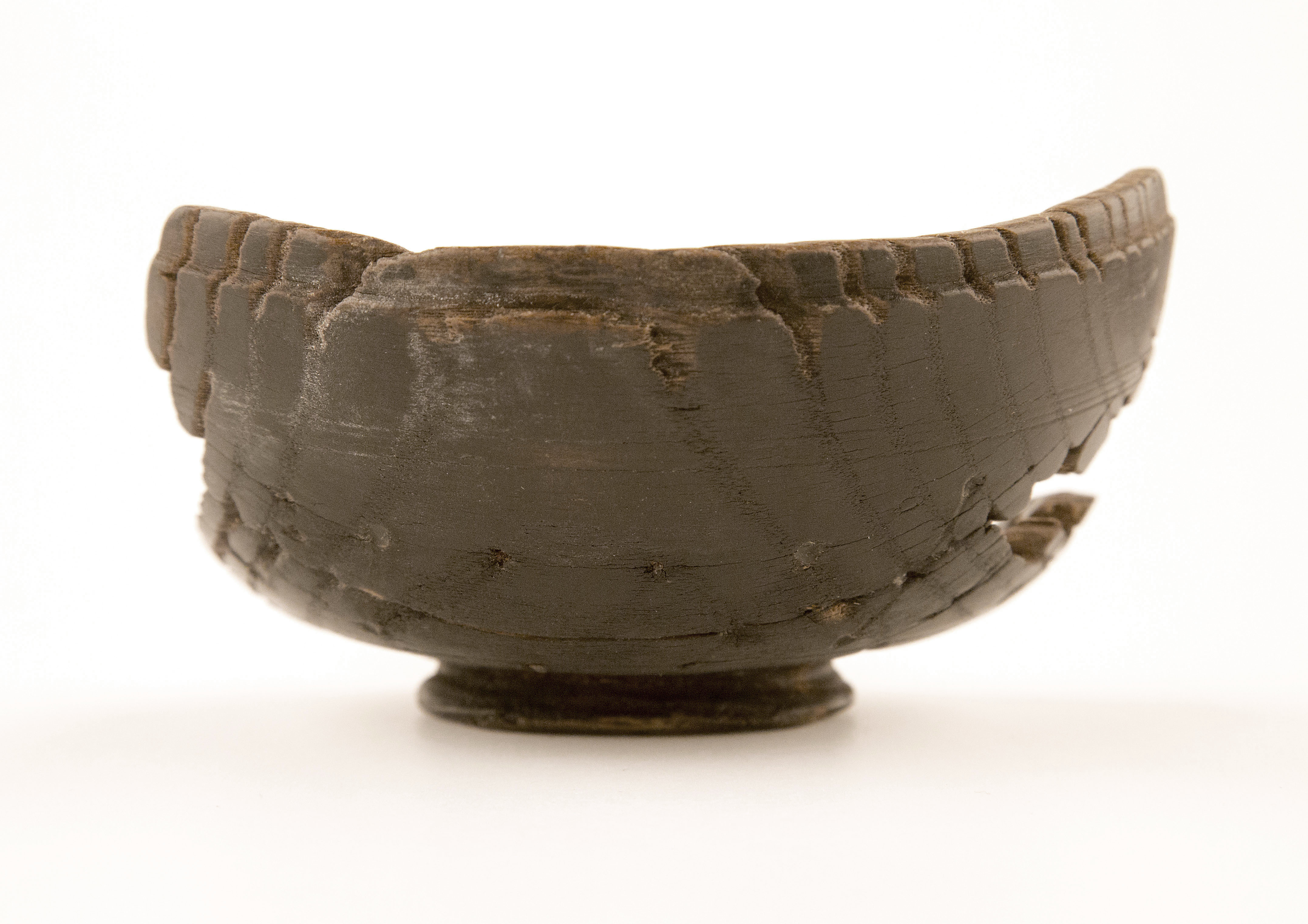

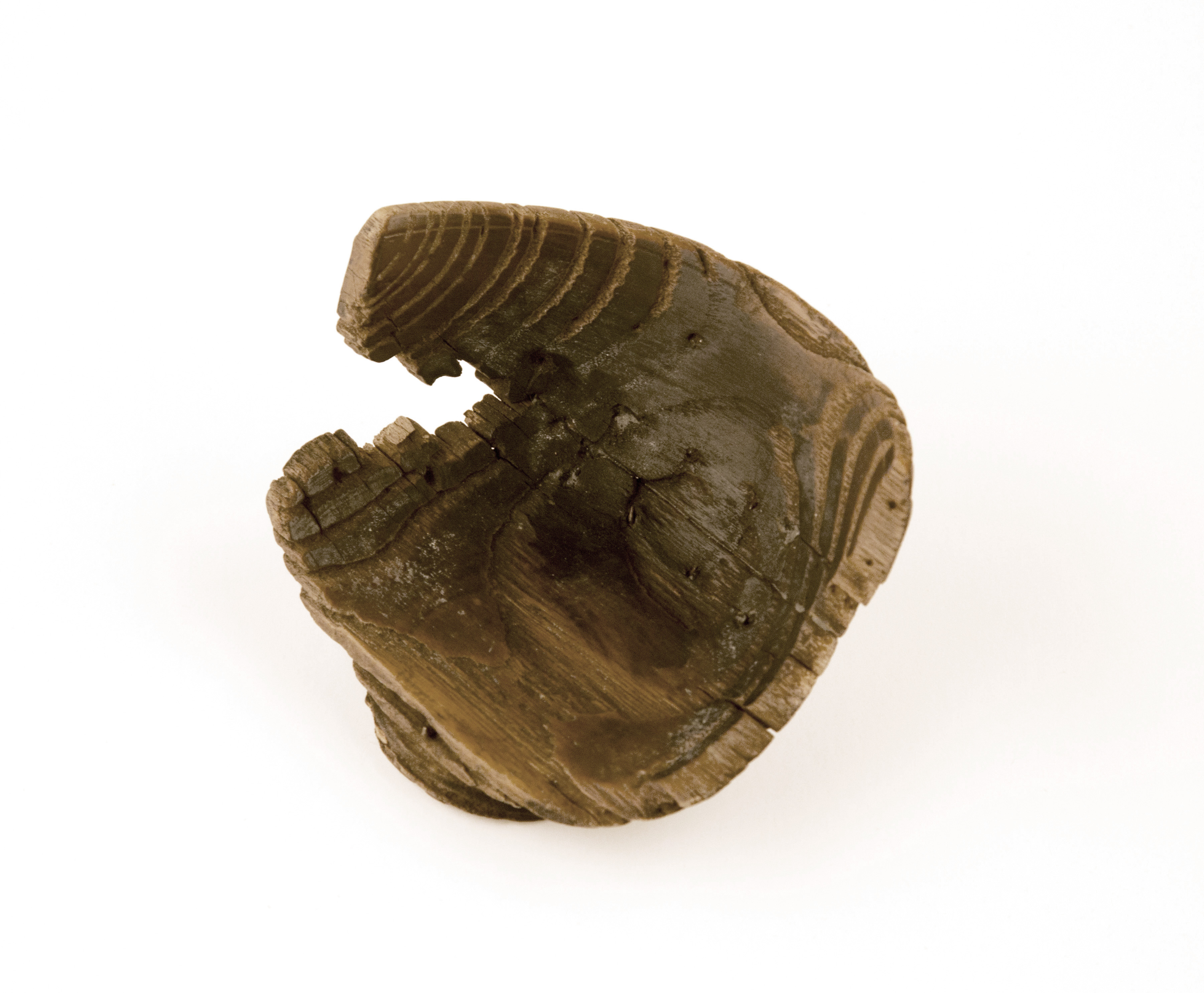

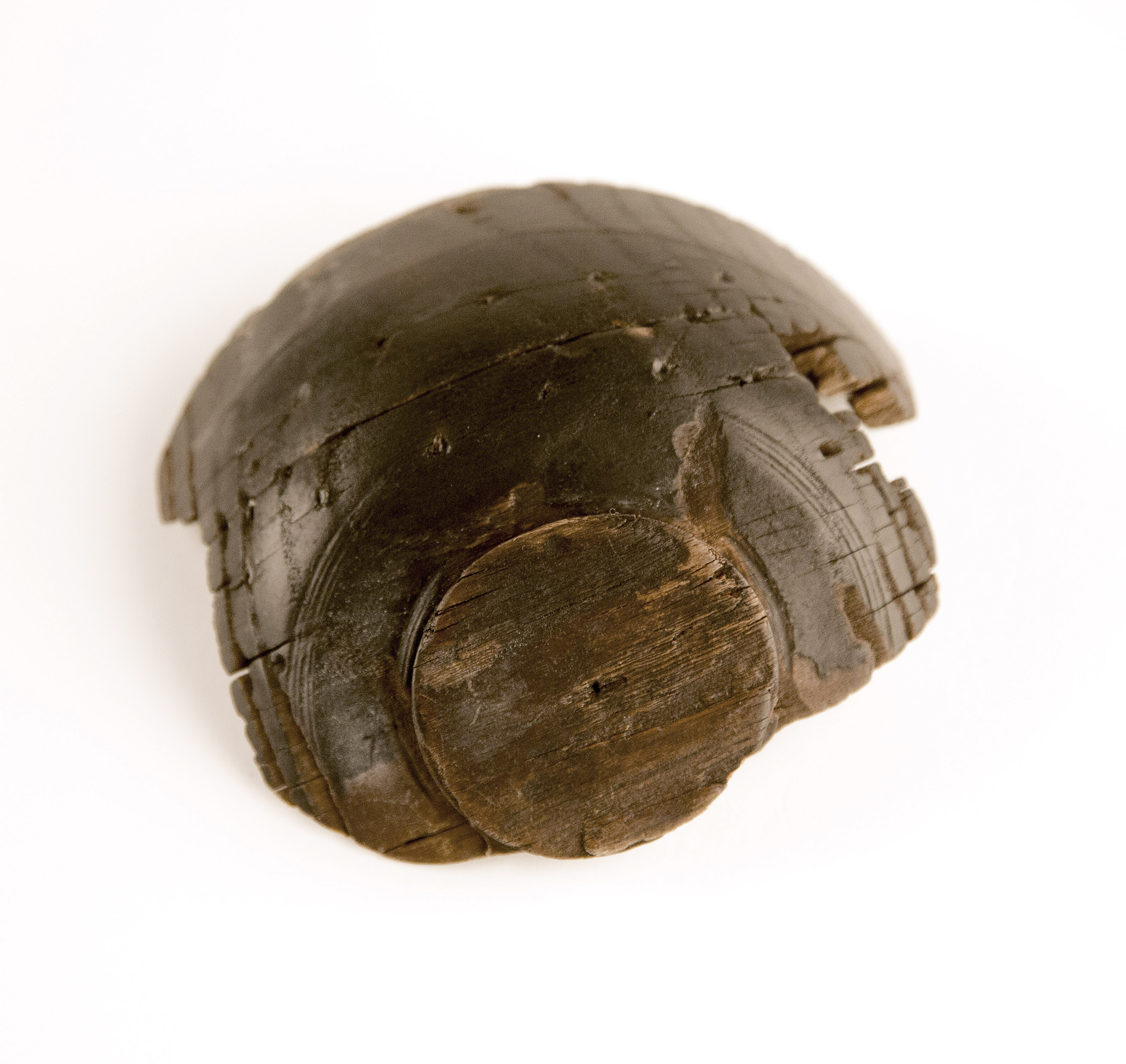

== See also ==
- Archaeology of Wales
- Wales in the Middle Ages
- Cornucopia (mythical vessels with magical powers)
- Mythological objects (list)
- Relics associated with Jesus
