= Omar Ramsden =

British silversmith (1873–1939)

- Born: 21 August 1873; Sheffield, Yorkshire
- Died: 9 August 1939 (aged 65)
- Education: Sheffield School of Art
- Occupation: Silversmith
- Parent(s): Benjamin Ramsden and Norah (née Ibbotson)

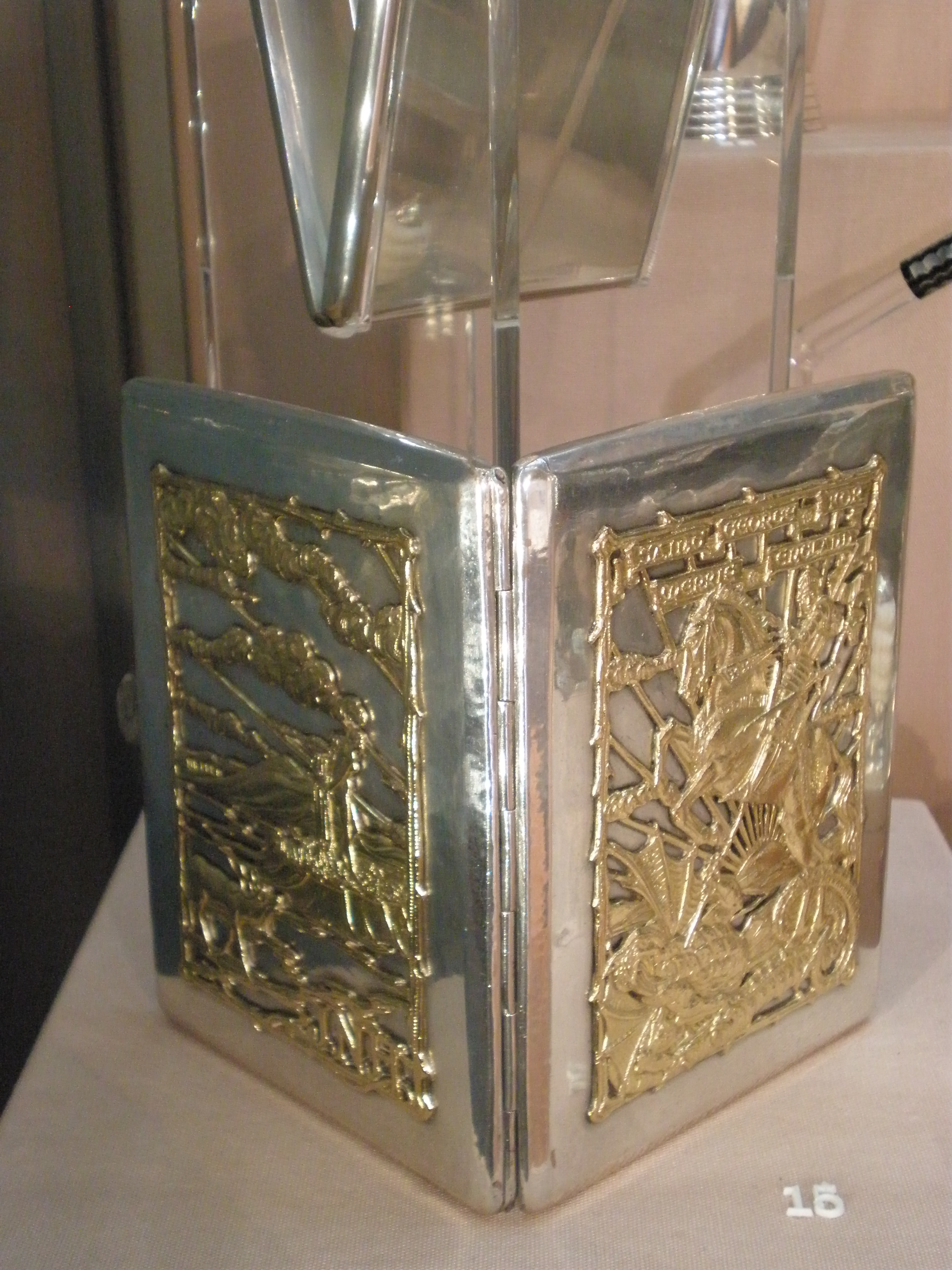
Cigarette Case on display at the Victoria and Albert Museum

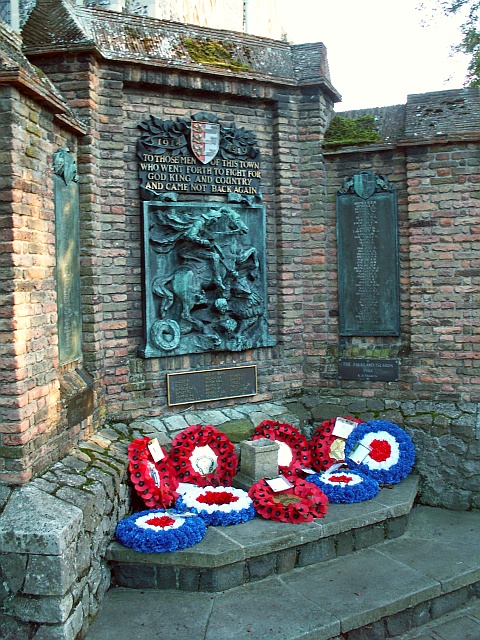
The War Memorial at Sandwich, Kent features a bronze of St George and the dragon, designed by Ramsden

Omar Ramsden (1873–1939) was an English silversmith. He was one of England's leading designers and makers of silverware. He lived on Fir Street in Walkley, Sheffield, Yorkshire, but spent his entire career working in London.

== Early life ==
Born in 1873 in Sheffield, he was named after an uncle. The uncle, in turn, had been named after the Ottoman field marshal Omar Pasha.

== Ramsden & Carr ==
Ramsden collaborated for many years with Alwyn Carr (1872–1940). Their first major work was in 1898 when they won a competition to design a mace for the new City of Sheffield: Sheffield had become a City in 1893.

Following their competition success, they moved to London, establishing the Ramsden & Carr studio together in Chelsea, but their partnership ended in 1919. Ramsden's mark used after their split was OMAR RAMSDEN ME FECIT (Latin: 'Omar Ramsden made me').

He was made a member of the Royal Miniature Society in 1921 and exhibited over 90 works with the Society. Both Ramsden and Carr were members of the Church Crafts League, and Ramsden would later become its Chairman.

== War memorials ==
Ramsden designed a number of war memorials in the immediate aftermath of WWI. They include the war memorial to the London Hop Trade (adjacent to the Southwark War Memorial); the Sandwich war memorial; the Mayfield war memorial (next to St Dunstan's Church, Mayfield); the war memorial chapel at St Luke's Church, South Park, Reigate; the war memorial at All Saints Church, Barrowby; the war memorial at Holy Trinity Church, Weston; and the war memorial (which specifically commemorates the Zeebrugge Raid of 1918) at St George's Canterbury.

The war memorials at Sandwich and Mayfield are Grade II listed.

There is a rosewater dish, which was given as a WWI war memorial, at the Carpenters Company's hall.

== Liturgical work ==
Ramsden and Carr were both Roman Catholics, and there was a large output of liturgical items, both from their partnership and from Ramsden's subsequent studio.

An early work from the partnership is the monstrance at Westminster Cathedral, which was made in 1907. This was included in an exhibition of Church plate at Goldsmiths' Hall in 2008. Ramsden later made an 'everyday crown' for the processional statue of Our Lady in 1928, but Cardinal Heenan sold the crown in 1969 for £6,600, with the money raised to be used to relieve the poor.

Westminster Abbey holds a large collection. This includes a St Edward the Confessor chalice and paten given by the Girls' Friendly Society on the occasion of their golden jubilee in 1925, a second St Edward chalice and paten given by Admiral Sir Arthur Moore in 1927, a chalice and paten (based on a 14th century example in the Victoria & Albert Museum) for use in St Faith’s Chapel given by the widow of Sir Robert Arundell Hudson in 1928, two pairs of alms dishes given in memory of Herbert Ryle, former Dean of Westminster, in 1928, a silver alms dish given by Carol Rivett (the crime novelist ECR Lorac), as well as two wafer boxes, a set of four plain chalices and patens, a morse and a mace used by the Abbey vergers. The future Emperor of Ethiopia, Haile Selassie, presented an ivory tusk to the Abbey in 1924. Ramsden then used the tusk in designing a processional cross. Unfinished at his death, it was completed by Lawrence Turner in 1940. The cross remains in use at the Abbey, and was carried in front of the coffin at the funeral of Diana, Princess of Wales.

Bath Abbey's processional cross is also by Ramsden. Made in 1925, it depicts the Adoration of the Shepherds on one side, and the Adoration of the Kings on the other.

Ramsden designed a Reliquary of the True Cross for the columbarium at the St Mary's, Bourne Street clergy house.

The Royal Green Jackets (Rifles) Museum in Winchester holds a communion set (from which Cosmo Lang, the Archbishop of Canterbury, administered communion to George V during his convalescence in 1929 from a lung operation. There is also a complete Ramsden communion set at St Agatha's Church, Sparkbrook.

A Festival of the Arts took place in Coventry in 1938 and Ramsden designed an altar cross and candlesticks for the cathedral. The Provost rescued them from the burning cathedral on the night of its destruction in 1940, and they are in use in the new cathedral.

The Grade II* listed St Dunstan's Church, Cranford has a Ramsden sanctuary lamp dating from 1937. Ramsden made the lamp out of the coronet of Frederick, the 5th Earl of Berkeley which was found in the Berkeley family vault.

As part of the Empire Exhibition held in Glasgow in 1938, the Scottish Episcopal Church erected a temporary church, All Hallows. The silverwork in the temporary church was made by Ramsden.

A set of three sanctuary lamps was given as a WWI war memorial to the mission church of St Mary the Virgin, Garratt Lane, Wandsworth. However, the church suffered bomb damage in WWII, but was rebuilt, and then much later was declared redundant; the lamps are now regarded as lost.

== Works in museum collections ==
Ramsden’s work is held by a number of institutions in the UK.

The British Museum holds a number of items, notably a mediaeval style silver girdle which was a wedding present to his wife.

Amongst other items, the V&A holds a very late bowl, from 1939–40, the Bluebird of Happiness, inspired by Maurice Maeterlinck’s play L’Oiseau bleu, The Blue Bird. The V&A also holds a Ramsden & Carr christening bowl from 1911-12 and a mazer bowl from 1921 to 1922.

There are items in various National Trust collections as well as in the Fitzwilliam Museum in Cambridge and The Wilson in Cheltenham (the former Cheltenham Art Gallery).

The Guild of Air Pilots and Air Navigators owns the Cumberbatch Trophy for international air safety, made in 1931 and first awarded in 1936.

Ramsden's archive of order books, design drawings and patterns for the period 1921-39 is held by the Library & Archive of the Goldsmiths' Company.

== Personal life ==
Ramsden married Annie Downs-Butcher, widow of Charles Downs-Butcher, in 1927. She carried on the studio for a short time after his death. He died in 1939, aged 65, just before the outbreak of war.

== Exhibitions ==
An exhibition was held at the Birmingham Museum and Art Gallery in 1973, on the centenary of Ramsden’s birth. The Millennium Gallery at Museums Sheffield held an exhibition on Ramsden & Carr in 2013-2014.
