= Else Mundal =

Norwegian philologist (born 1944)

Else Olaug Mundal (born 8 November 1944) is a Norwegian philologist.

She was born in Vanylven Municipality and graduated with the cand.philol. degree in 1971. She was appointed as a docent in Norse philology at the University of Oslo in 1977. Being promoted to professor in 1985, she was a professor at the University of Bergen from 1994. She is a fellow of the Norwegian Academy of Science and Letters. In 2017 she was appointed a knight of the Icelandic Order of the Falcon in connection with the state visit of Iceland's president to Norway.

== Bibliography (selection) ==
- Odd Einar Haugen, Bernt Øyvind Thorvaldsen og Jonas Wellendorf (red.): "Fjǫld veit hon frœða: Utvalde arbeid av Else Mundal", Oslo: Novus, 2012. ISBN 978-82-7099-706-0
- Else Mundal and Håkan Rydving (red.): Samer som «de andra», samer om "de andra". Identitet och etnicitet i nordiska kulturmöten, Umeå: Samiska studier, Umeå universitet, 2010. ISBN 978-91-7459-051-7
- Slavica Ranković, Leidulf Melve og Else Mundal: Along the oral-written continuum. Types of texts, relations and their implications, Turnhout: Brepols, 2010. ISBN 978-2-503-53407-7
- Jon Gunnar Jørgensen, Karsten Friis-Jensen og Else Mundal (red.): Saxo og Snorre, København: Museum Tusculanums Forlag, 2010. ISBN 978-87-635-3124-5
- Else Mundal and Jonas Wellendorf: Oral art forms and their passage into writing, København: Museum Tusculanum Press, 2008. ISBN 978-87-635-0504-8
- Else Mundal and Simonetta Battista (red.): Reykholt som makt- og lærdomssenter. I den islandske og nordiske kontekst, Reykholt: Snorrastofa, 2006. ISBN 9979-9649-2-8
- Else Mundal and Anne Ågotnes (red.): Ting og tekst, Bergen: Bryggens museum, 2002. ISBN 82-90289-80-4
- Else Mundal and Ingvild Øye (red.): Norm og praksis i middelaldersamfunnet, Bergen: Senter for europeiske kulturstudier, 1999. ISBN 82-91320-18-7
- Ann Christensson, Else Mundal og Ingvild Øye (red.): Middelalderens symboler, Bergen: Senter for europeiske kulturstudier, 1997. ISBN 82-91320-16-0
- Else Mundal: Legender frå mellomalderen. Soger om heilage kvinner og menn, Oslo: Samlaget, 1995. ISBN 82-521-4511-6
- Else Mundal: Sagadebatt, Oslo: Universitetsforlaget, 1977. ISBN 82-00-01376-6
- Eskil Hanssen, Else Mundal og Kåre Skadberg: Norrøn grammatikk. Lydlære, formlære og syntaks i historisk, Oslo: Universitetsforlaget, 1975. ISBN 82-00-01336-7
- Else Mundal: Fylgjemotiva i norrøn litteratur, Oslo: Universitetsforlaget, 1974. ISBN 82-00-08989-4
