= Mazer (drinking vessel) =

Wooden drinking vessel

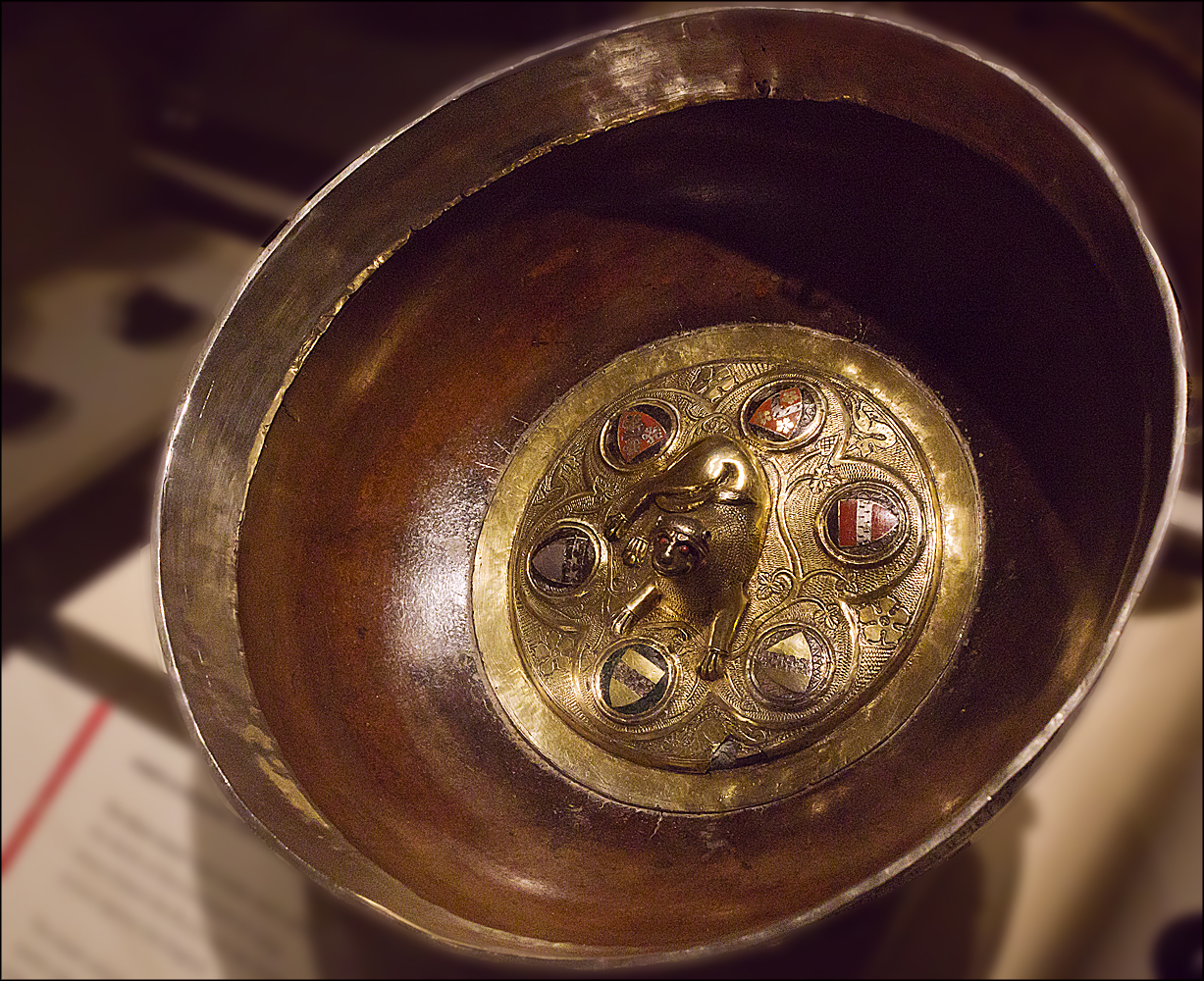
The Scottish Bute Mazer, with an unusually fine boss with a reclining lion and heraldry in the centre of the bowl. 1314–1327.

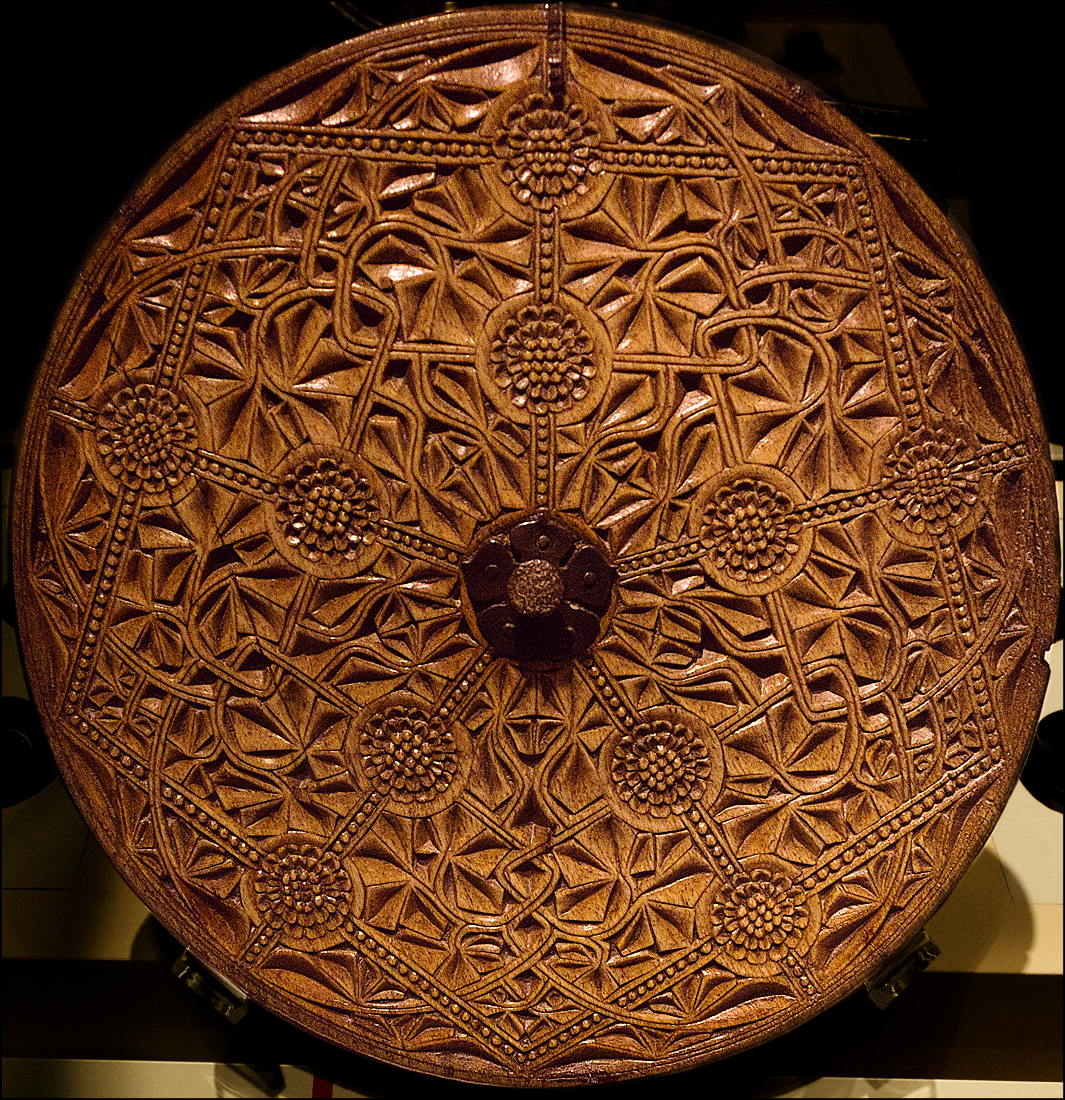
The Bute Mazer's whale-bone cover, c. 1500

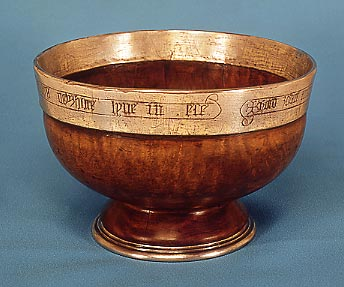
Mazer, maplewood with silver-gilt mounts, made around 1380. The boss is engraved with the sacred monogram "IHC" [Jesus]. The mounts are engraved, 'Hold yowre tunge and say ye best and let yowre neyzbore sitte in rest hoe so lustyye God to plese let hys neyzbore lyve in ese' (Hold your tongue and say the best / And let your neighbour sit in rest / He is so eager to please God / He lets his neighbour live in ease). Victoria and Albert Museum, London

A mazer is a special type of wooden drinking vessel, a wide cup or shallow bowl without handles, with a broad flat foot and a knob or boss in the centre of the inside, known technically as the "print" or "boss". Mazers vary from simple pieces all in wood to those ornamented with metalwork, often in silver or silver-gilt. They use dense impervious woods such as maple ("mazer" is an obsolete name for the maple tree), beech and walnut. They represent a north European medieval tradition, and mostly date from the 11th (or earlier) to the 16th centuries.

== Etymology ==
A form of the word mazer may have existed in Old English, but the evidence for this is slight. (The Oxford English Dictionary records speculation, for example, that the word occurs in the place-name Maserfield whose etymology is, however, uncertain.) The modern English word instead derived from Middle English mazer (and its variant spellings); this word was borrowed from Anglo-Norman, a dialect of Old French. Middle English or Anglo-Norman also gave the word to Welsh, as masarn ('maple, sycamore') and dysgl masarn ('mazer bowl').

The Old French word mazre and its variants in turn derive from German, and it is clear that the word must have existed in Common Germanic, where it can be reconstructed as *masuraz. In the West Germanic languages it is found as Old Saxon masur ('swelling') and Old High German masar ('knot or swelling of a tree'), and later in the Middle Ages as Middle Dutch māser ('knot or swelling of a tree', especially a maple), Middle Low German māser ('curly-grained wood'), Middle High German maser ('curly-grained wood, excrescence on the maple and other trees, drinking cup made of curly-grained wood'). In the North Germanic languages it appears as Old Icelandic mǫsurr ('maple tree, veined wood')—including in the form mǫsurr skál ('maplewood vessel')—and Swedish masur ('curly-grained wood').

The Germanic word *masuraz is thought to share its base with Old High German māsa ('spot, scar') and English measles, a base which may also have influenced the word maple. Whether this word has cognates elsewhere in the Indo-European languages is, however, uncertain.

== Description ==
The examples that have been preserved above ground are generally of the most expensive kind, with large mounts in silver, but some archaeological sites have produced quantities of plain wood mazers, which were no doubt the most common at the time. The wreck of the Mary Rose is one example of a group find, and the Nanteos Cup a single survival. They are typically between 5 and 11 inches (130 and 280 mm) in diameter.

Ornamented types usually have a rim or "band" of precious metal, generally of silver or silver gilt; the foot and the print being also of metal. There are examples with wooden covers, sometimes with a metal handle, such as the Bute Mazer or Flemish and German mazers in the British Museum. On the outside, but generally not the inside of the metal band there is often an inscription, religious, or convivial, and the print was also often decorated with a sculpted or engraved plate, and sometimes a gem. The Bute Mazer is one of the most elaborate to survive, with a three-dimensional reclining lion rising from the base, and enamelled coats of arms in a circle around it. Saints, the religious monogram IHS, and animals, often no doubt with heraldic significance, are other common decorations of the boss. Many metal pieces that appear to be mazer bosses have been excavated. An example from York Minster grants an indulgence of 40 days remission from Purgatory for all who drink from it.

Later examples may be raised on a stem, perhaps copying the style of covered cups; some from about 1550 onwards are effectively tazzas that are partly in wood. The later mazers sometimes had metal straps between the rim and the foot, as were added to the Bute Mazer. Examples continued to be produced after the main period ended in the 16th century, perhaps with a deliberate sense of traditionalism. Some modern woodturners and silversmiths have continued to produce examples, especially Omar Ramsden.

Mounted examples are turned very finely, often from burr maple from the field maple. Both the wood and the vessels made of it were known as "mazer", so in contemporary accounts sometimes they are referred to as ciphis de mazer (drinking bowl of burr maple wood), and sometimes simply as a "mazer". The best mazers had silver or silver gilt rims added. Commonly prints were also added (a decorated disc in the base of the bowl), and occasionally, normally on later mazers, a silver or gilt foot was also added.

== Use ==
The size of wooden mazers was restricted by the relatively small size of the trees that gave the best dense and grained wood. The addition of a metal band might double the capacity of a mazer. Large ornamented mazers were probably passed around the table for toasts and the like, as some covered cups were, but more ordinary ones may have been regarded as personal within a group such as a household, ship or monastery, with the finer examples likely being reserved for the leading figures. Evidence from inventories suggests many mazers were given names.

A record of customs at a monastic community in Durham records that each monk has his own mazer "edged with silver double gilt", but also an especially large one called the "Grace cup" was passed around the table after Grace. Another such, called the "Judas cup", was only ever used on Maundy Thursday. Parish churches might be bequeathed mazers, and use them at "church ales" and other parish occasions. Decorated mazers are often included and briefly described in wills and inventories. In 1395 John de Scardeburgh, rector of Tichmarsh, left twelve mazers, two more than were recorded in an inventory of the treasure of Henry IV of England four years later. But monastic inventories could include dozens, including an exceptional 132 in an inventory of 1328 at Christ Church, Canterbury.

In inventories, normally in medieval Latin, they are called by a variety of names (all the plural forms): "ciphi or cuppae de mazero or de murra, mazeri, cyphi murrae, mazerei, or hanaps de mazer (French).

== Surviving examples ==
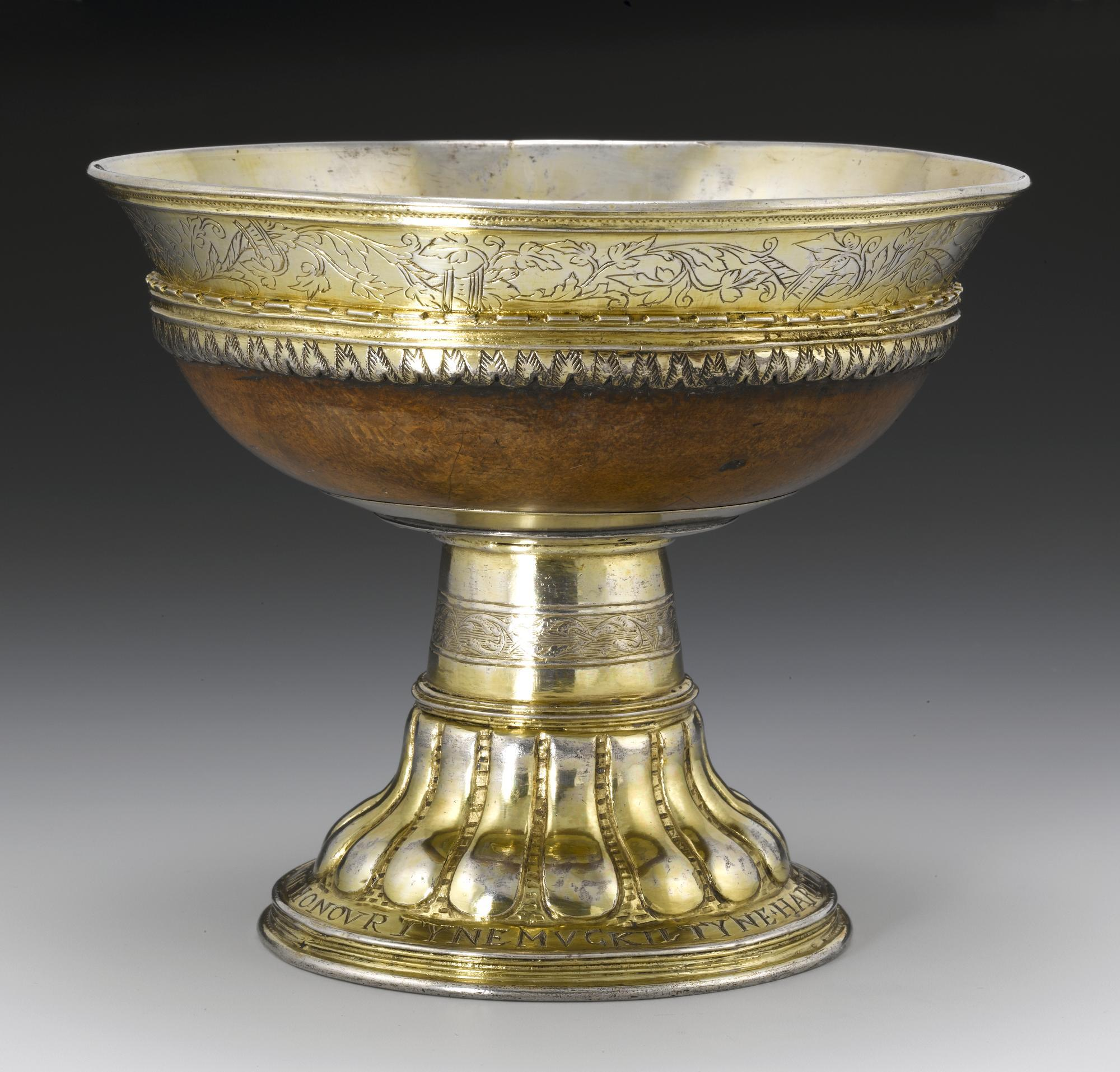
The Watson Mazer is the earliest in a series of Scottish standing mazers from the early 16th century. National Museum of Scotland

Over 60 British medieval mazers are known to survive. Many of the English survivals were preserved in Oxbridge colleges, livery companies, hospitals and other institutions going back to the Middle Ages. Relatively few have been passed down in wealthy families, though all such at the time would have owned them; the Bute Mazer is an exception here. A mazer still belonging to All Souls College, Oxford, but on loan to the Ashmolean Museum, was donated to the college in 1437, at the time of its foundation by Thomas Ballard, a landowner in Kent.

Another example in a college is the late 14th-century Swan Mazer of Corpus Christi College, Cambridge, where a swan surmounts a thin column rising from the boss. If the mazer is filled too full, liquid runs down the column and out of the foot, no doubt a trick played on unwary first-timers dining at the college.

Over the late Middle Ages there is a movement from deep bowls with narrow rims to shallower bowls and much wider rims. In the 13th and 14th century rims tend to be simple and plain, only about 1 cm deep without lettering, 15th and 16th century rims are very characteristic with a very deep (3–4 cm moulded form) often with lettering. One exception to this rule is the mazer which Samuel Pepys drank from in 1660 (on display in the British Museum), the rim of this mazer is hallmarked 1507/8 but it is of the earlier simple form. A good display is at the Museum of Canterbury, where ten 13th and 14th century mazers are shown.

A very fine example in the British Museum, from France or Flanders, probably in the early 15th century, has a very thin wooden bowl, and silver mountings of excellent quality, including enamels, but neither the cup nor the cover have metal on the rim, or ever seem to have done so. The cuir-bouilli travelling-case also survives.

The Watson Mazer is the earliest in the sequence of Scottish standing mazers, featuring the coat of arms for David Watson of Saughton. Chemical analysis places it in the early 16th century. It is constructed of a maplewood bowl with a silver-gilt band, resting on a silver stem and an inscribed trumpet-shaped foot. Possibly the work of Adam Leys, today it is part of the Silver Treasury, level 5 of the National Museum of Scotland Scotland Galleries in Edinburgh.

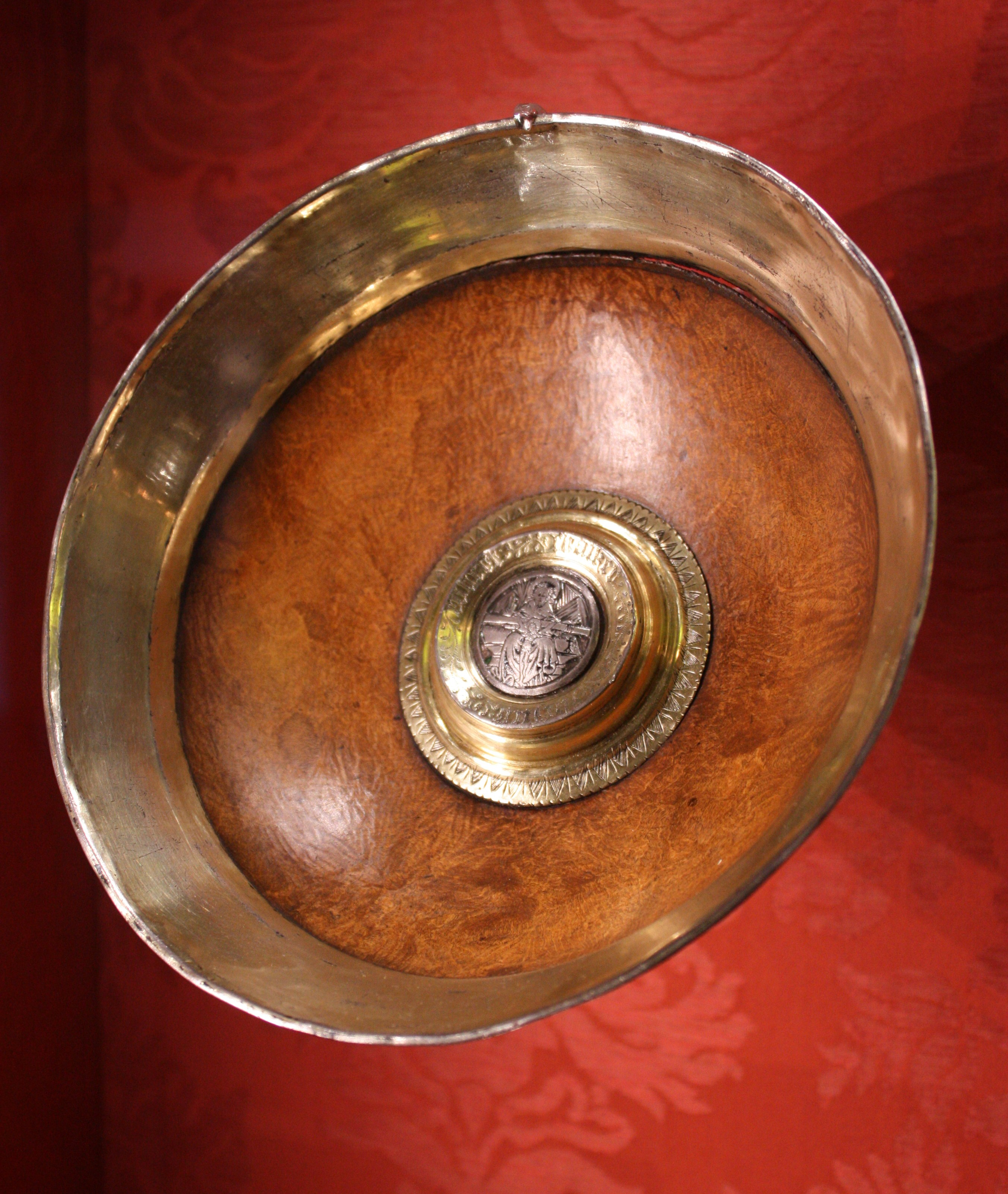
The "Robert Chalker Mazer", Britain 1480–1500, Victoria and Albert Museum. Maplewood with silver-gilt rim and boss. The boss is engraved with the Trinity, originally enamelled, an unidentified merchant's mark and the inscription ROBERT CHALKER IESUS.

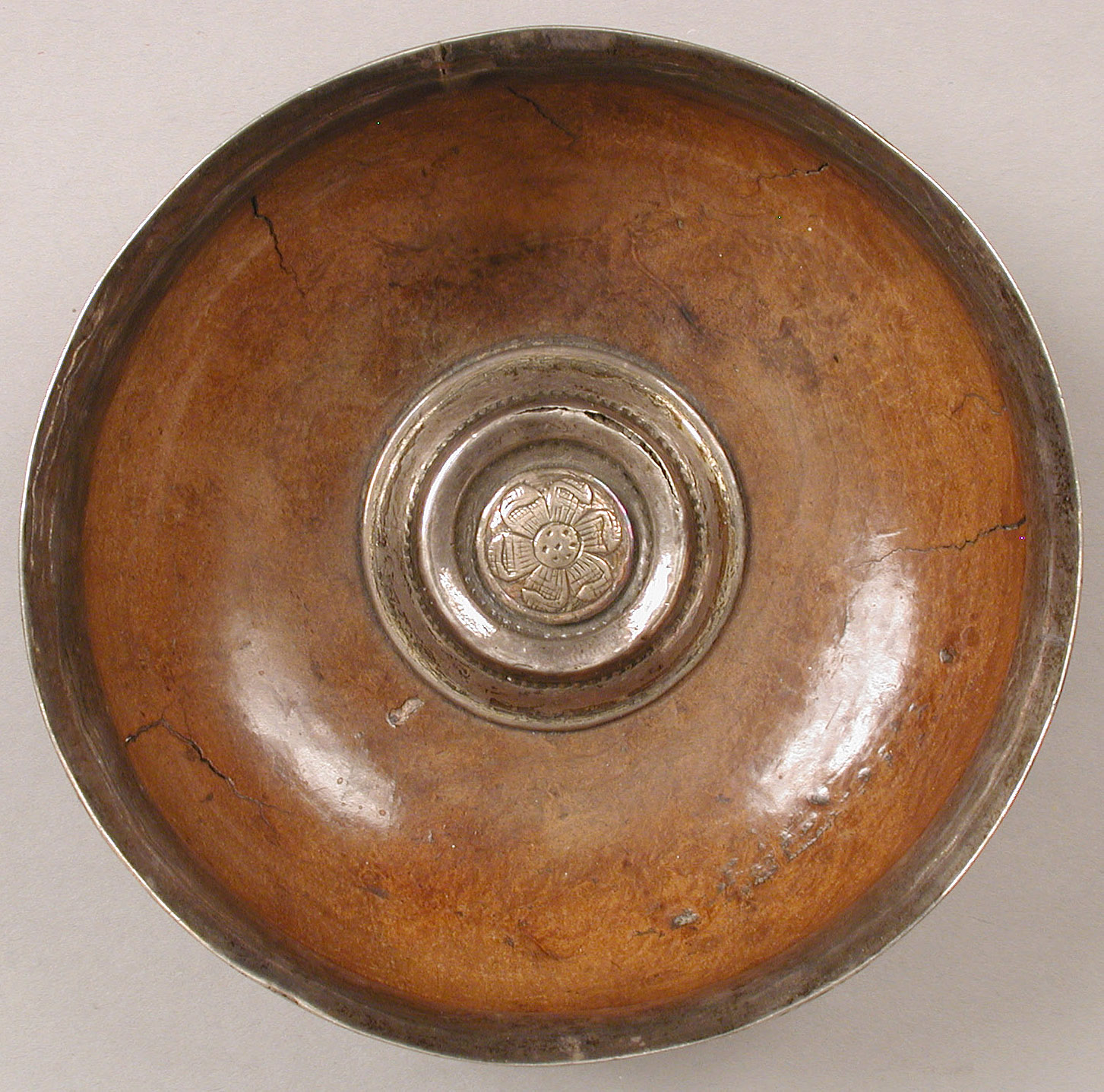
Britain, 15th-century, The Cloisters

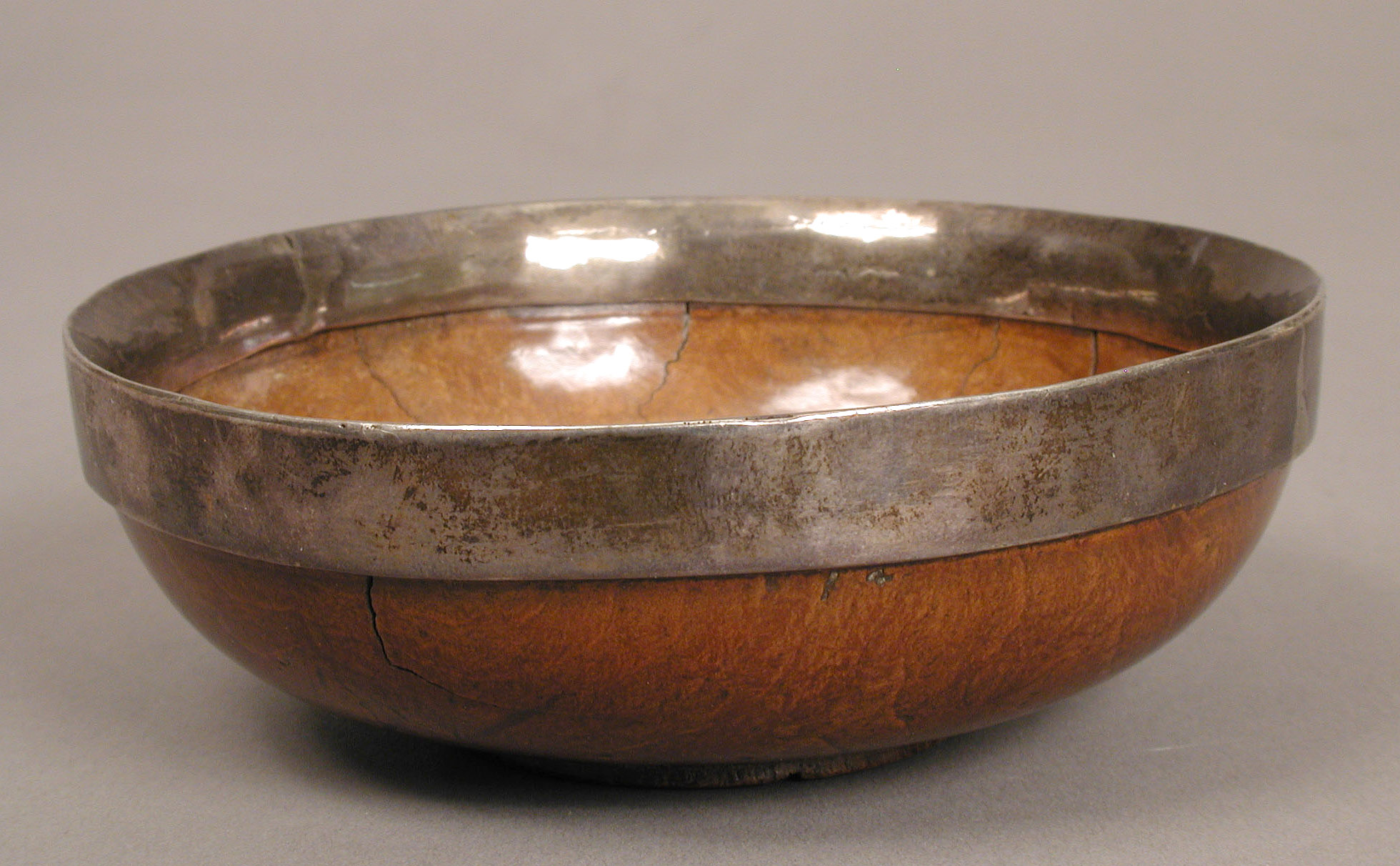
Side view of the same

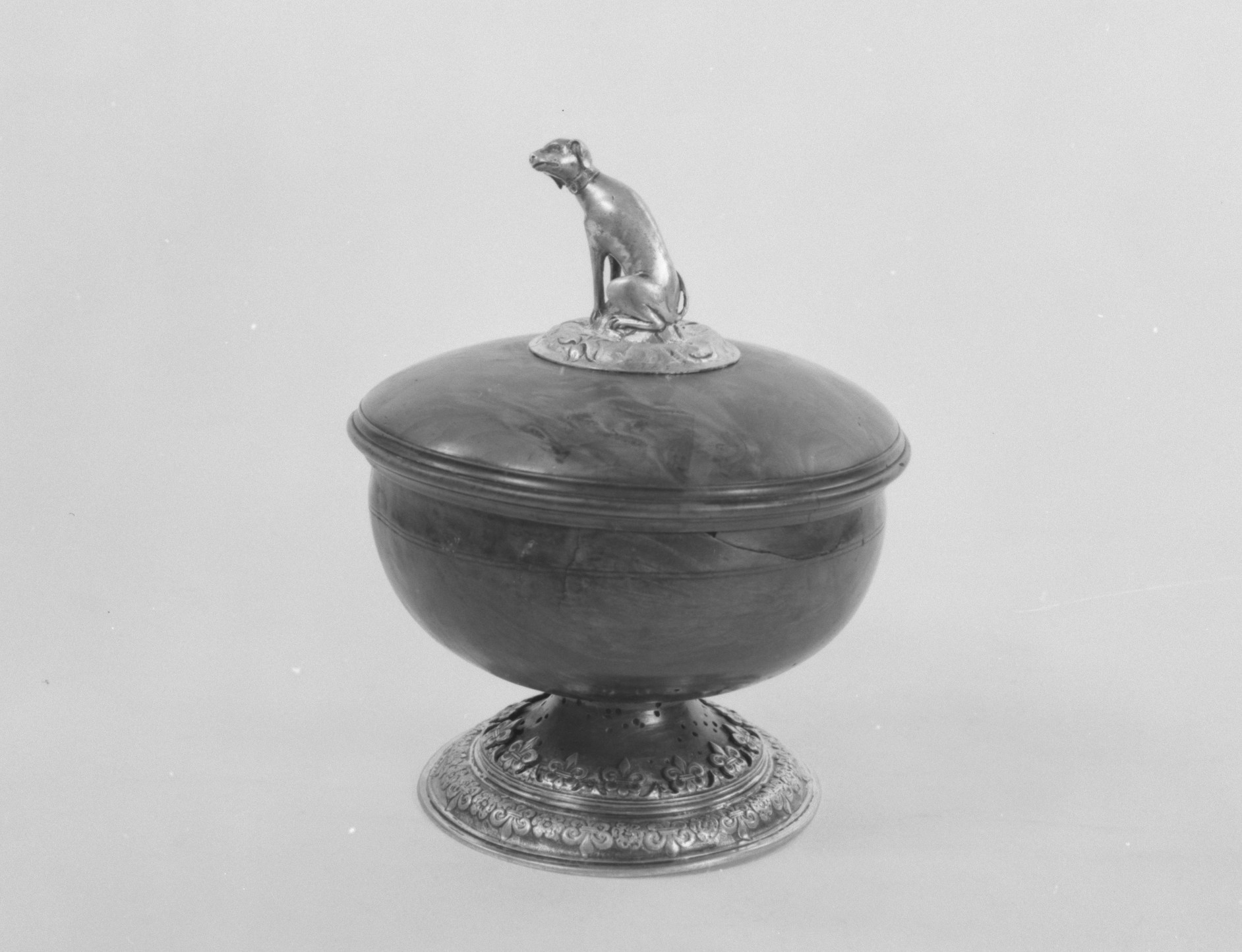
The silver dog handle late 17th-century

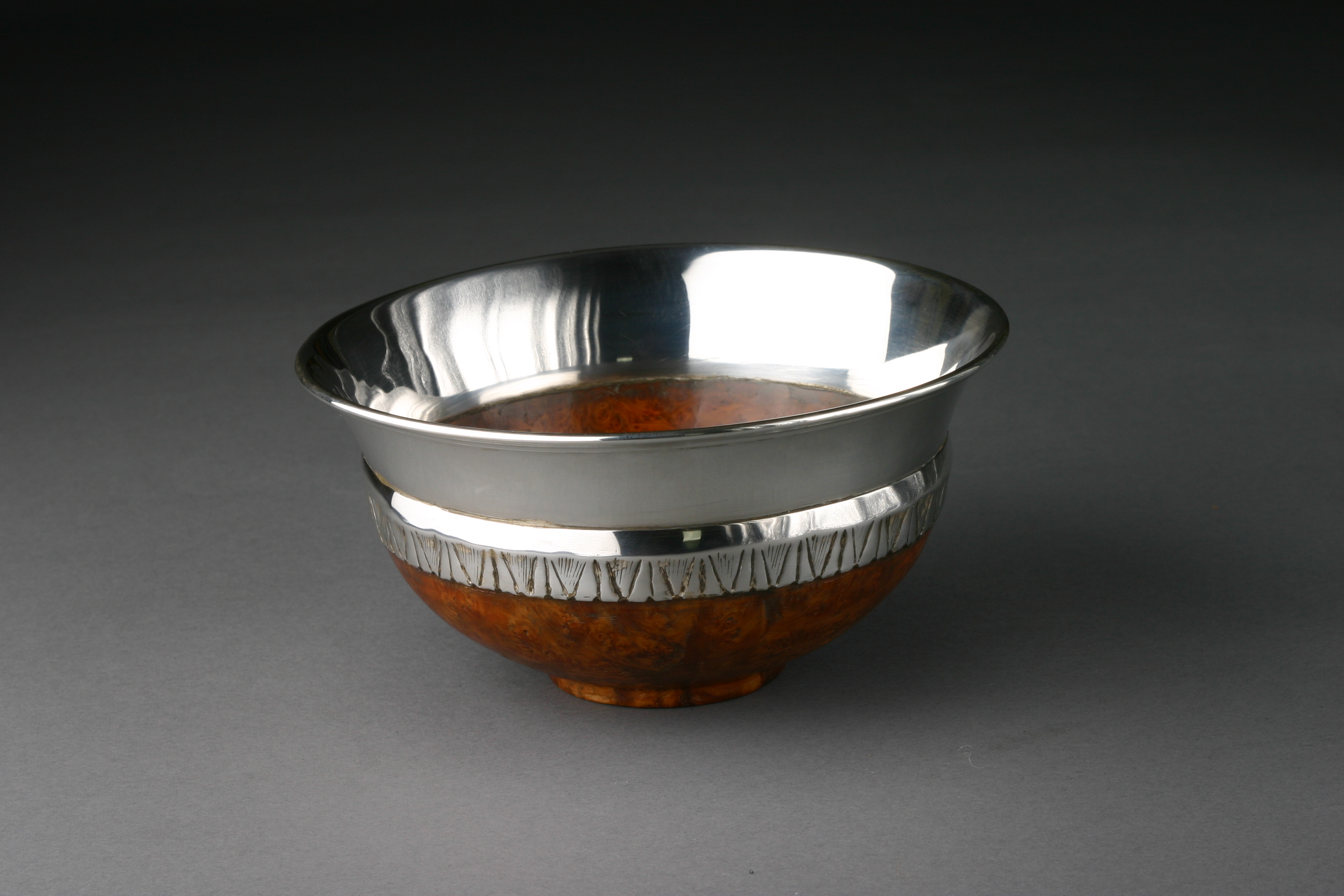
Modern rowan and silver mazer by Robin Wood

== See also ==
- Nanteos Cup
