= Saga of Hávarður of Ísafjörður =

Icelandic saga

The saga of Hávarðr of Ísafjörður (Icelandic: Hávarðar saga Ísfirðings) is one of the sagas of Icelanders. In its present form, the saga was probably written in the early 1300s. The saga discusses many of the social, ethical, and political realities of medieval Icelanders including kinship relationships, reciprocity, and the ability of individuals to change.

== Synopsis ==
The aging Hávarðr, a once renowned Viking, lives at his farm with his wife Bjargey and his son Óláfr. The local chieftain, Þorbjörn, is considered an unfair and difficult individual. When Óláfr returns lost sheep to Þorbjörn's farm and strikes up an acquaintance with Sigriður, a woman whom Þorbjörn is keeping as a servant against her will, Þorbjörn takes offence and treats Óláfr badly. Óláfr continues to gain popularity in the region through various good deeds -- including battling a Draugr on behalf of his neighbors -- and tensions between him and Þorbjörn rise as a result. When Óláfr helps Sigriður move out of Þorbjörn's home, Þorbjörn slays Óláfr and cuts out his teeth -- which he places in a bag.

Hávarðr is devastated at the loss of his son and becomes bedridden for an entire year -- leaving his wife Bjargey to manage the affairs of the farm. When she convinces him to go to Þorbjörn to ask for compensation for their son, Þorbjörn merely insults Hávarðr and sends him away empty-handed. Hávarðr, dejected, returns to his bed for another year.

When the Alþing begins, Bjargey once more convinces Hávarðr to seek redress for their son's death. This time, by seeking the help of Þorbjörn's brother-in-law Gestir, Hávarðr is able to convince Þorbjörn to pay compensation for the killing. Þorbjörn, however, reneges during the payment out of spite and throws the bag of Óláfr's teeth at Hávarðr's face. This act enrages Gestir who quickly dissolves his kinship with Þorbjörn. Hávarðr -- humiliated once more -- returns to bed for another year.

Bjargey, who has been managing the farm since Óláfr's death, goes to her own brothers' farms and enlists the help of their sons to help take revenge. When she returns home and chides Hávarðr once more to take action, he suddenly becomes vigorous and sets out with his nephews to slay Þorbjörn. The party finds Þorbjörn and his retinue completely unprepared and they attack. After killing Þorbjörn, Hávarðr and his party immediately proceed to the farm of one of Þorbjörn's brothers and kill him as well. They then retreat to the farm of Steinþor, a chieftain who had promised support to Hávarðr during the last Alþing.

When two boys kill Ljótur -- another of Þorbjörn's brothers who shared his predisposition for bullying behavior -- for extorting their father over land rights, they also seek shelter at Steinþor's farm and join with Hávarðr's group. The large group's feasting quickly puts pressure on Steinþor's food stores, however, and he goes to his rich but stingy brother-in-law Atli for assistance.

Though resistant to helping Steinþor at first, Atli's wife -- Steinþor's sister -- convinces him to relent and Atli experiences a change of heart after a light admonishing by Steinþor to be a better man. Atli commits to help Hávarðr and let his group stay at his farm while Steinþor goes to legally represent Hávarðr's group for the slayings in the lawsuit brought by the last of Þorbjörn's brothers, the chieftain Þórarinn.

Þórarinn intends to be present at the lawsuit while secretly sending a group to slay Hávarðr and his party at Atli's home. The assassins lose the element of surprise, however, when Atli is warned of the impending attack in a dream. A vicious battle ensues in which Atli proves to be quite a capable warrior in his own right despite his appearance and the assassins are routed. Victorious, Atli and Hávarðr's group smear hot tar on the survivors, cut off their ears, and send them to the assembly to report their failure.

At the assembly, Gestir judges that all of the killings balance each other out and no compensation is owed to Þórarinn, though he does proclaim that Hávarðr's nephews must leave Iceland for as long as Þórarinn lives. When the maimed survivors of the failed ambush arrive and Þórarinn's plot is revealed, Gestir is furious, but allows the judgement to stand.

Hávarðr's nephews leave Iceland and Hávarðr and Bjargey take a ship to Norway where they convert to Christianity. After Bjargey dies, Hávarðr returns to Iceland and is remembered as a great man.

== Christian Religion in the Saga ==
In a key scene of the saga, Hávarðr seeks revenge and with a group of men attempts to confront Þorbjörn. Instead of facing Hávarðr, Þorbjörn flees into the sea and swims away, but Hávarðr gives chase. Þorbjörn climbs up on a small island or rock formation and picks up a large rock to hurl at Hávarðr, who is climbing up after him. Then, Hávarðr is said to have thought of a different faith he had heard of when he was young abroad and swears that he will take this faith if he manages to survive. Þorbjörn then drops the slippery rock on himself and Hávarðr easily slays him.

== English Translations ==
Durrenberger, E. Paul and Dorothy (1996). The Saga of Havarður of Ísafjörður: With an essay on the political, economic and cultural background of the saga. Middlesex: Hisarlik Press. ISBN 978-1-874312-19-2.

Heinemann, Fredrik J. (1998). The Saga of Havard of Isafjord (Hávardar Saga ísfirðings). in The Complete Sagas of Icelanders, Vol. V. Reykjavík: Leifur Eiríksson Publishing. ISBN 9789979929307.

== Other sources ==
- Durrenberger, E. Paul and Dorothy (1996) The saga of Hávarður of Ísafjörður (Middlesex : Hisarlik Press) ISBN 9781874312192
