= Jón Árnason (author) =

Icelandic folklorist

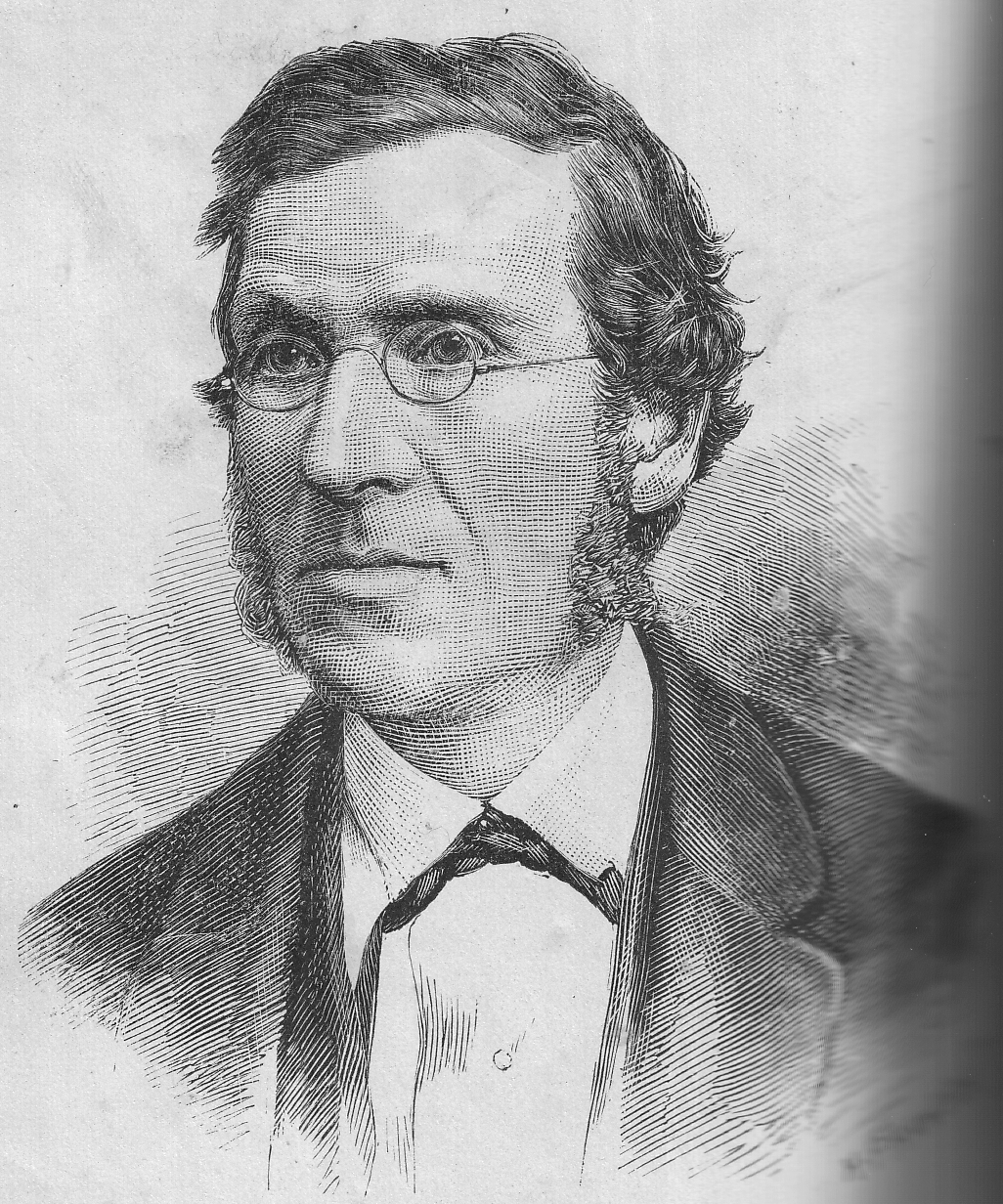
- A portrait of Árnason, engraved by Hans Peter Hansen (1861)
- Born: 17 August 1819; Hof, Iceland
- Died: 4 September 1888 (aged 69); Reykjavík, Iceland
- Education: Menntaskólinn í Reykjavík
- Occupations: Author; librarian; museum director

Jón Árnason (17 August 1819 – 4 September 1888) was an Icelandic author, librarian, and museum director who made the first collection of Icelandic folktales.

== Career ==
Jón Árnason was educated at the Latin School in Bessastaðir.

From 1848 to 1887, he was the first librarian at what became the National Library of Iceland in Reykjavík; in 1881 its name was changed from Íslands stiptisbókasafn (Foundation library of Iceland) and his title became Landsbókavörður Íslands (National Librarian of Iceland). Meanwhile he also served as the first librarian of the Iceland branch of the Icelandic Literary Society.

He was also the first curator of the Forngripasafns Íslands (Icelandic Antiquities Collection), which became the National Museum of Iceland, when it was founded in 1863. For a long time he ran both the museum and the library.

In addition, he supplemented his small salary by working as secretary to the Bishop and as a teacher and custodian of the library at the Latin School, which had moved to Reykjavík. In 1877, when he was put forward as one of two Icelandic representatives to the centennial celebration of Uppsala University, the government in Copenhagen objected to a "porter" representing Iceland because he was "janitor of the Iceland High School", as Guðbrandur Vigfússon anonymously worded it in an obituary.

== Folk tales and other publications ==
Inspired by the brothers Grimm's Kinder- und Hausmärchen (Grimm's Fairy Tales), Jón began to collect and record folktales, together with Magnús Grímsson, a friend who was a schoolmaster and later a clergyman. Their first collection, Íslenzk Æfintýri (Icelandic Folktales) appeared in 1852, but attracted little notice. The two only resumed collecting after Konrad Maurer, the German legal historian and scholar of Icelandic literature, toured the country in 1858 and encouraged them. After Magnús Grímsson died in 1860, Jón Árnason finished the collection on his own. It was published in 2 volumes in 1862 and 1864 in Leipzig with Maurer's help, as Íslenzkar Þjóðsögur og Æfintýri (Icelandic Folktales and Legends), comprising over 1300 pages. In 1954–61 it was reissued in Reykjavík in 6 volumes.

Jón and Magnús lacked the time and means to travel much to collect tales, instead relying on present and former pupils and other contacts to send them tales in writing. Also either they or Jón may have "touched up" the wording. However, the changes he is known to have made are slight, and the universal admiration for the saga style and relative lack of educational and class differences in Iceland mean that stylistic tastes differed less there than elsewhere in Europe in the 19th century.

Jón Árnason also wrote biographies of Martin Luther (1852), Charlemagne (1853), and Sveinbjörn Egilsson.

== Personal life ==
Jón married late in life but his son died before he did. He died after a long illness.

== Influence ==
The survey of Icelandic folklore and early modern scholarship about elves (álfar) in the introduction to Jón's Íslenzkar þjóðsögur og æfintýri provided the framework for J. R. R. Tolkien's conception of elves in his fantasy fiction.

== Publications ==
- Jón Árnason and Magnús Grímsson (Ed.) Íslenzk Æfintýri. Reykjavík, 1852.
- Jón Árnason. Íslenzkar Þjóðsögur og Æfintýri. 2 vols. Leipzig: J.C. Hinrichs, 1862, 1864.
- Jón Árnason. Ágrip af æfisögu Dr. Marteins Lúters. Reykjavík, 1852. OCLC 52435258
- Jón Árnason. Sagan af Karlamagnúsi keisara. Copenhagen, 1853. OCLC 264953221
