= William Thomas Rowland Powell =

Welsh member of parliament

Member of Parliament for Cardiganshire
- In office 7 May 1859 – 20 July 1865
- Preceded by: Ernest Vaughan
- Succeeded by: Thomas Lloyd

Personal details
- Born: 8 August 1815
- Died: 13 May 1878 (aged 62)
- Party: Conservative
- Children: George E. J. Powell

William Thomas Rowland Powell (8 August 1815 – 13 May 1878) was a Welsh landowner and Conservative politician who served as Member of Parliament for Cardiganshire from 1859 until 1865.

== Early life ==
Powell was born on 8 August 1815, son of Colonel W.E. Powell of Nanteos and his first wife, Laura-Edwyna, eldest daughter of James Sacksville Tufton Phelp, of Coston House, Leicestershire. His father was MP for Cardiganshire from 1816 until his death in 1852, and served as Lord Lieutenant of the county. He was educated at Westminster School. He gained a commission in the army, and served for some years in the West Indies before retiring in 1854 with the rank of captain. Powell later served as Colonel of the Royal Cardiganshire Militia and as a magistrate and deputy lieutenant for Cardiganshire and also as a magistrate for Montgomeryshire.

On 1 May 1839, Powell married Rosa Edwyna, daughter of William George Cherry of Buckland, Herefordshire in 1839. They had two children, namely:

- George Ernest John Powell (10 February 1842 – 1882), collector
- Harriet (born 15 October 1844), who died of tuberculosis aged 13.

Powell and his wife lived apart for many years. Laura died in 1860.

== The 1859 General Election ==
Even though he suffered from ill-health, most notably a paralysis that restricted the use of his legs, Powell was elected MP for Cardiganshire, his father's former constituency, at the 1859 General Election, when he defeated Saunders Davies of Pentre by a small margin. His opponent's father, D.A. Saunders Davies, had previously served as MP for Carmarthenshire until his death in 1857. Powell was successful despite the fact that his opponent had the support of the majority of the county's landed gentry, most of whom were located in the south of the county. This was demonstrated by the fact that in the Cardigan district, Davies had a substantial majority. However, in Aberystwyth district, the northern part of the county, where Nanteos was located, Powell won by an even more decisive margin Both candidates were said to hold similar political views and Powell sat in Parliament as a Liberal-Conservative, The fact that he was supported by the former Conservative MP for Cardigan Boroughs, John Lloyd Davies, demonstrates that Powell was hardly a radical candidate.

== The 1865 General Election ==
In February 1865, Powell was embroiled in a very public and embarrassing court case which attracted considerable public attention. It was alleged that he had made an offer of marriage to a Miss Lewis, which was later withdrawn. A case of breach of promise was brought against Powell which resulted in Miss Lewis being awarded damages of £2000.

Powell had announced his retirement some time before the 1865 General Election on account of his ill-health. Thomas Lloyd of Bronwydd emerged as a Liberal candidate to contest the seat but, shortly before the election, Powell reversed his decision and announced that he would once again contest the seat. However, there was some opposition to Powell within Conservative ranks on account of his alleged neglect of his parliamentary responsibilities. In May 1865 he was absent from a vote on parliamentary reform when an attempt was made by Edward Baines to introduce a motion to extend the borough franchise.

Lloyd withdrew in his favour. However, it soon became apparent that he would be challenged by a more radical Liberal candidate and both David Davies, Llandinam and Henry Richard canvassed for support in the constituency. Reluctant to face a contested election, Powell retired from the fray. At the consequent election, Lloyd was returned after a narrow victory over David Davies.

Powell's retirement marked the end of the long period where the squire of Nanteos sat in the House of Commons. Powell's son, George, was briefly mentioned as a potential candidate for the Cardigan Boroughs in 1868 but nothing came of the suggestion.

== Later life and death ==
Unlike his father, Powell did not speak Welsh, and neither did his cousin, William Edward Phelp, who managed the estate at Nanteos. This may have accounted for poor relationships with tenants on the estate. During the 1868 General Election campaign, Powell supported the Conservative candidate and, while there were no evictions as recorded elsewhere, this caused a further deterioration in the relationship between landowner and tenants.

In later years, Powell's health was poor and he spent his winters in Italy or the south of France. In the spring of 1878 he returned from Nice and set up residence at the Crystal Palace Hotel, Norwood, London. He died there on 13 May 1878.

On 16 May, Powell's body was brought to Aberystwyth by train. He was buried two days later in the family vault at Llanbadarn Fawr church.

== Sources ==
- Colyer, R.J. (1980). "Nanteos: A Landed Estate in Decline, 1800-1930" (PDF). Ceredigion. 9 (1): 58–77.
- Jones, Ieuan Gwynedd (1964). "Cardiganshire Politics in the Mid-Nineteenth Century" (PDF). Ceredigion. 5 (1): 14–41.
- Kilsby Jones, J.R. (October 1865). "Etholiadau Ceredigion a Meirionnydd" (PDF). Traethodydd (in Welsh). XX (4): 488–512.

Parliament of the United Kingdom
Preceded by Ernest Vaughan	Member of Parliament for Cardiganshire; 1859–1865	Succeeded by Thomas Lloyd
