= Matthew Vaughan-Davies, 1st Baron Ystwyth =

British politician (1840–1935)

Matthew Vaughan-Davies

Matthew Lewis Vaughan-Davies, 1st Baron Ystwyth (17 December 1840 – 21 August 1935) was a Welsh Liberal Party politician and was Liberal MP for the Cardiganshire Division from 1895 until 1921.

== Background ==
He was born at Tan-y-Bwlch, Cardiganshire, the only son of Matthew Davies of Tan-y-Bwlch. He was educated at Harrow School, but only stayed for a year. He married, in 1889, Mrs Mary Jenkins. She died in 1926. They had no children.

== Early political career ==
He served as High Sheriff of Cardiganshire in 1875. He served as a Justice of the Peace and a Deputy Lieutenant in Cardiganshire. He was the Conservative candidate in the seat in 1885 but then went over to William Gladstone.

In 1889, Vaughan Davies sought election as Conservative candidate for Llanfarian at the inaugural Cardiganshire County Council elections but was defeated by another Conservative, Morris Davies, by fifteen votes. Three years later, however, Davies stood as a Liberal candidate. This was an unexpected development as he had been a pillar of Conservatism in Cardiganshire for many years, and one factor may have been his marriage to Mrs Mary Jenkins, a wealthy widow from Swansea, in 1889. She was later elected president of the Aberystwyth Women's Liberal Association, and was a keen supporter of women's suffrage.

Vaughan Davies captured the seat, and remained a member of the County Council for over fifteen years.

== Member for Cardiganshire ==
=== The 1895 General Election ===
Having actively supported the sitting member, William Bowen Rowlands at the 1892 General Election it soon became known that Davies was interested in the Liberal nomination. This was strongly resisted by leading figures in the local Liberal Association, such as the Aberaeron merchant J.M. Howell who suspected Davies's commitment to Liberal policies, a suspicion later borne out by embarrassing evidence of his behaviour towards tenants on his own Tanybwlch estate.

However, Davies was eventually chosen as candidate defeating Wynford Phillips by 160 votes to 111 at a delegate conference. Kenneth O. Morgan has argued that this was due to his support among rural areas where electors 'resented the social climbing of the Aberystwyth bourgeoisie;. It was reported at the time that the influence of the Aberystwyth element within the Liberal Association had been resented ever since the Cardiganshire County Council was formed in 1889. Vaughan Davies was regarded as an outsider who was also sternly opposed by the Aberystwyth-based Cambrian News, who stated that his selection was 'a more complete defeat of Liberalism than if Mr Harford, the Conservative candidate, had been placed at the head of the poll by a large majority'. There is no doubt that his selection created divisions in the Liberal ranks. Some compared the extent of the divisions with the position in 1886 when David Davies had defected to the Liberal Unionists. Nevertheless, a closer examination of the way delegates from individual wards voted at the selection conference indicates that both candidates drew support from rural wards and while the nineteen delegates from Aberystwyth voted for Phillips the eleven delegates from the county town of Cardigan supported Davies.

He was elected at the 1895 General Election. Although his majority fell by 800 votes from that recorded by Bowen Rowlands in 1892, it remained a comfortable victory over J.C. Harford of Falcondale, one of the ablest local landlords in the county.

General election 1895 Cardiganshire Electorate 12,994
Party	Candidate	Votes	%	±%
Liberal	Matthew Lewis Vaughan-Davies	4,927	56.8	
Conservative	John Charles Harford	3,748	43.2	
Majority		1,179	13.6	
Turnout			66.8	
Liberal hold		Swing		

=== Later career ===
Five years later, against the same opponent, his majority was reduced.

General election 1900 Cardiganshire Electorate 13,299
Party	Candidate	Votes	%	±%
Liberal	Matthew Lewis Vaughan-Davies	4,568	54.7	
Conservative	John Charles Harford	3,787	45.3	
Majority		781	9.4	
Turnout			62.8	
Liberal hold		Swing		

Thereafter, Vaughan Davies was comfortably returned at each election but the vitality of the Liberal Association was in serious decline, and by 1914 it was heavily dependent on Vaughan Davies's role as treasurer to keep it going. In the meantime, Vaughan Davies remained on poor terms with prominent Liberals, including John Gibson of the Cambrian News.

General election 1906 Cardiganshire Electorate 13,215
Party	Candidate	Votes	%	±%
Liberal	Matthew Lewis Vaughan-Davies	5,829	66.3	
Liberal Unionist	C E D M Richardson	2,960	33.7	
Majority		2,869	32.6	
Turnout			66.5	
Liberal hold		Swing		

General election January 1910 Cardiganshire Electorate 13,333
Party	Candidate	Votes	%	±%
Liberal	Matthew Lewis Vaughan-Davies	6,348	68.3	
Conservative	George Fossett Roberts	2,943	31.7	
Majority		3,405	36.6	
Turnout			69.7	
Liberal hold		Swing		

In December 1910, he was returned unopposed at the second general election of that year. He sought re-election at the 1918 General election and was the endorsed candidate of Lloyd George's Government. He faced no opponent, so was returned unopposed. He was the oldest member of the House of Commons between 1918 and 1921.

He held the seat until 1921 when he was elevated to the peerage as Baron Ystwyth, of Tan-y-Bwlch in the County of Cardigan, in the 1921 New Year Honours. As Lord Ystwyth had no children the title became extinct on his death in August 1935, aged 94.

Parliament of the United Kingdom
Preceded by William Bowen Rowlands	Member of Parliament for Cardiganshire; 1895–1921	Succeeded by Ernest Evans
Preceded by Jesse Collings	Oldest Member of Parliament (not Father of the House); 1918–1921	Succeeded by Donald Macmaster
Peerage of the United Kingdom
New creation	Baron Ystwyth; 1921–1935	Extinct

== Bibliography ==
- Morgan, Kenneth O. (1967). "Cardiganshire Politics: The Liberal Ascendancy 1885-1923". Ceredigion. 5 (4): 311–346.
- Palmer, Caroline (2004). "Matthew Lewis Vaughan Davies - ambitious cad or assiduous politician?". Ceredigion. 14 (4): 73–104.
