= Ceredigion (UK Parliament constituency) =

UK Parliament constituency (1997–2024)

- Former county constituency for the House of Commons
- Boundary of Ceredigion in Wales
- Preserved county: Dyfed
- Population: 75,922 (2011 census)
- Electorate: 57,556 (March 2014)

1997–2024
- Seats: One
- Created from: Ceredigion and Pembroke North
- Replaced by: Ceredigion Preseli

1536–1983
- Replaced by: Ceredigion and Pembroke North
- Senedd: Ceredigion, Mid and West Wales

Ceredigion (previously Cardiganshire) was a parliamentary constituency (Note: A county constituency (for the purposes of election expenses and type of returning officer)) represented in the House of Commons of the UK Parliament. (Note: As with all constituencies, the constituency elects one Member of Parliament (MP) by the first past the post system of election at least every five years.) Created in 1536, the franchise expanded in the late 19th century and on the enfranchisement of women. Its boundaries remained virtually unchanged until 1983. From 1536 until 1885 the area had two seats (electing MPs): a county constituency (Cardiganshire) comprising the rural areas, the other the borough constituency known as the Cardigan District of Boroughs comprising a few separate towns; in 1885 the latter was abolished, its towns and electors incorporated into the former, reduced to one MP. The towns which comprised the Boroughs varied slightly over this long period, but primarily consisted of Cardigan, Aberystwyth, Lampeter and Adpar, the latter now a suburb of Newcastle Emlyn across the Teifi, in Carmarthenshire.

The county constituency (a distinction from borough class remains, namely as to type of returning officer and permissible electoral expenses) was merged in 1983 with part of Pembrokeshire, making a new constituency named Ceredigion and Pembroke North. In 1997 it was recreated and its non-Anglicised name became its formal name, Ceredigion.

The Ceredigion Senedd constituency was created with the same boundaries in 1999 (as an Assembly constituency).

The constituency was abolished as part of the 2023 Periodic Review of Westminster constituencies and under the June 2023 final recommendations of the Boundary Commission for Wales. The entire constituency forms part of Ceredigion Preseli.

== Boundaries ==
Map of boundaries 1997-2024

The boundaries of this constituency mirror almost exactly those of the county of Ceredigion.

=== Proposed constituency changes ===
Under proposed constituency boundary changes announced in September 2016, ahead of the then 2024 general election, the seat's boundaries were to be extended. The seat, which has the proposed name of Ceredigion and North Pembrokeshire, includes all of the current Ceredigion constituency, the northern part of the current Preseli Pembrokeshire constituency, a small part of Carmarthen West and South Pembrokeshire around the village of Dre-fach Felindre, as well the south-western part of Montgomeryshire around Llanidloes.

== History ==
Ceredigion, formerly known by the anglicised version of its name as Cardiganshire, was first enfranchised in 1536 when King Henry VIII incorporated Wales within England. The county was given one member, who was to be elected by each person who owned property of a sufficient value. In addition the inhabitants of Cardigan, Aberystwyth, Adpar and Lampeter were given the right to elect one MP between them, with the vote restricted to the Freemen. The general election of 1715 saw the return of Lewis Pryse, who was expelled from the House of Commons in the following year for refusing to attend the House to take oaths of loyalty to King George I after the Jacobite rising, with which he sympathised.

=== Reformed elections ===
From 1832 the Reform Act changed the electoral system so that householders of homes worth over £10 were enfranchised in the boroughs. The Borough constituency was still dominated by the Loveden-Pryse family based in Gogerddan who were supporters of the Liberals; Pryse Pryse held the seat unopposed from 1818 until his death in 1849, except for the 1841 election when he narrowly retained the seat after a controversial contest. The Cardiganshire county constituency, however, was dominated by the Powell family of Nanteos who were Conservatives. William Edward Powell held the seat from 1816 until shortly before his death in 1854. By agreement between the followers of Gogerddan and Nanteos, neither challenged the others' nomination and as a result there were no contested elections in the county until 1859.

Following Powell's retirement, the representation fell to Ernest Vaughan of Trawscoed, whose politics were Conservative.

The county saw its first contest in the 1859 general election when Colonel W.T.R. Powell of Nanteos sought to re-establish the family's claim to the county seat. He was opposed by Arthur Saunders-Davies of Pentre but prevailed by a narrow margin. Both candidates held conservative views but Powell sat as a Liberal-Conservative.

However, the era where Nanteos could claim the seat were numbered, and Sir Thomas Lloyd of Bronwydd was mooted as a potential Liberal candidate at the 1854 by-election, and again at the General Elections of 1857 and 1859.

By the 1865 general election, Powell had indicated some twelve months prior to the election that he would retire and Lloyd of Bronwydd was selected as the Liberal candidate. However, when Powell reversed his decision, Lloyd issued an address stating that he would not oppose the sitting member. The result was that both Henry Richard and David Davies offered themselves as candidates. A selection meeting was arranged to be held at Aberaeron, but shortly before this took place, Powell announced his retirement. Lloyd now stated that he would now fight the seat after all and Richard withdrew in his favour. David Davies, however, did not withdraw and came within 361 votes of victory.

Lloyd transferred to the borough in the 1868 election when the seat was captured by Swansea industrialist, E.M. Richards. This election is often regarded as a landmark when tenant farmers allegedly refused to follow patterns of age-old deference and vote in line with the wishes of their landlords. Following this election there were claims of intimidation by Conservative landlords and a national fund was set up to support those purportedly evicted from their farms. In reality, however, Richards' victory owed much to the support of the powerful Pryse family of Gogerddan.

In 1874, the Conservative candidate Thomas Edward Lloyd of Coedmore captured the seat for the Conservatives, defeating Richards by 215 votes. The result was greeted with disbelief in Liberal ranks, particularly since the introduction of the secret ballot was expected to have favoured the Liberals. However, the Conservatives had chosen a candidate who was popular in his locality and not been involved in conflicts with his tenants. The Liberals were also caught unprepared for the contest, with Lloyd's candidature kept secret until nomination day. Much capital was also made of the fact that Lloyd was a Cardiganshire man, in contrast to Richards, a Swansea industrialist. The result was reversed in 1880 although there were close contests for the county thereafter, on a slightly widened franchise.

=== Single constituency ===
In a redistribution of seats for the 1885 general election, the borough constituency was abolished and absorbed into the county. This brought into the county seat the more radical politics of urban voters in the boroughs of Aberystwyth, Cardigan, Lampeter and Adpar. More significantly, the further widening of the franchise in 1884 added between five and six thousand new voters to the register by extending the pattern of household suffrage to the counties. The majority of these voters would have been tenant farmers, the more prosperous agricultural labourers, and householders in small towns or large villages such as Tregaron, Aberaeron, New Quay, Aberporth, Tal-y-bont and Borth, which had not been part of the old Cardigan Boroughs constituency. The impact of the widening of the franchise and boundary changes was to increase the electorate from 5,026 in 1883 to 12,308 by 1886. It was assumed that these changes would make the county a reasonably safe bet for the Liberal Party and that supporters of Gladstone would be comfortably returned at every election. These structural changes to the political arrangements of the county were also taking place against wider social and economic developments which affected all aspects of Cardiganshire life. Traditional industries were in decline, agriculture was increasingly in crisis and it was becoming increasingly difficult for a still-increasing population to earn a living within their native parishes and communities. As a result, there were two major consequences. Firstly there was a significant population shift as a result of emigration, in the majority of cases to the south Wales valleys. Secondly, the great landed estates of the county, which had for so long dominated the politics of the county, were in many cases heavily in debt. This second factor contributed to the loss of landowner influence in the politics of the county, a trend that became very apparent at the first elections to the Cardiganshire County Council.

Initially, the predictions that Gladstonian Liberals would dominate county politics were realised, in 1885, David Davies was elected to represent the constituency with a majority of 2,323 (24.2%) on a turnout of 78%, heavily defeating the Conservative, Matthew Vaughan Davies. Although David Davies was no public speaker, he drew substantial support in Cardiganshire as a generous benefactor of the new university college at Aberystwyth and also through his links with Calvinistic Methodism, which had over 13,000 members in the county. Allied to this was a particularly effective Liberal association which paid close attention to the registration of voters.

In 1886, however, Davies broke with Gladstone over home rule for Ireland in 1886 and a number of his associates such as Robert J. Davies, Cwrtmawr followed him into the Liberal Unionist camp. He sought re-election as a Liberal Unionist but lost by 9 votes to William Bowen Rowlands, who was the Gladstonian candidate. This election split the Liberal Party in Cardiganshire and the election was hotly contested with almost all the landowners, including those previously regarded as having Liberal sympathies, supporting Davies. He also received the support of several prominent Liberals, especially from his own Methodist denomination. The result of the election was largely attributed to the influence of nonconformist ministers over their congregations, although the more effective canvassing of supporters by the Liberal Association was also identified as an important factor.

Even though Bowen Rowlands's victory was by the closest of margins it was a decisive moment in the political history of Cardiganshire. It proved that a Gladstonian Liberal candidate, even an Anglican with strong Irish Nationalist sympathies, could triumph in Cardiganshire even against the resources and religious connections of a candidate such as David Davies. Although Liberal Unionism continued to be championed by a relatively small group, led by the journalist Henry Tobit Evans, who published a newspaper, Y Brython, at Lampeter, most of the leading Liberals who had defected to Davies eventually returned to the fold, in some cases to contest the 1889 County Council elections. The demise of Liberal Unionism was confirmed at the 1892 general election when, William Jones, a self-made Birmingham draper who had a small estate in Cardiganshire and was a member of the Cardiganshire County Council ran with the support of Joseph Chamberlain. Chamberlain had sponsored a number of Nonconformist unionist candidates in Wales in the hope of capitalising upon perceived antipathy towards Irish Nationalism. Despite spending heavily and producing a farmer evicted at the 1868 Election on his platform, Jones was heavily defeated by Bowen Rowlands. Rowlands served until 1895.

Once Rowlands's intention not to stand again was known, Matthew Vaughan Davies of Tan-y-Bwlch, who had been the Conservative candidate in the seat in 1885, but who had subsequently joined the Liberal Party, emerged as a contender for the nomination and was eventually chosen by a delegate conference, defeating Wynford Phillips by 160 votes to 111. The choice of Vaughan Davies was controversial and was strongly opposed by the Aberystwyth-based Cambrian News on the basis of his former association with the Conservative Party. Indeed, the paper went as far as to equate the division with that of 1886. There is no doubt that the choice of Vaughan Davies created deep divisions in the Liberal ranks. However, despite these divisions he saw off a strong Conservative candidate by a comfortable if reduced majority.

Matthew Vaughan-Davies was the longest serving MP for the constituency, holding it from 1895 to 1921. His closest electoral call came in the 'Khaki election' of 1900 when he had a majority of 781 (9.4%) over J.C. Harford of Falcondale. Thereafter, Vaughan Davies was comfortably returned at each election but the vitality of the Liberal Association was in serious decline. During this time the Cambrian News had tempered its opposition to him and grudgingly admitted that Vaughan-Davies had won friends and supporters by his adherence to Liberal policies.

By 1914 the Liberal Association was heavily dependent on Vaughan Davies's role as treasurer to keep it going. In the meantime, Vaughan Davies remained on poor terms with prominent Liberals, including John Gibson, editor of the Cambrian News until his death in 1915.

Like most Welsh Liberals, he supported David Lloyd George in the split in the Liberal Party, and not H. H. Asquith, and was therefore returned unopposed as a Coalition Liberal in 1918.

=== Liberal infighting (1921–1950) ===
In many ways the Liberals had become the new elite in Cardiganshire by the time of the First World War. This was demonstrated in 1919 when John Humphreys Davies, the nonconformist squire of Cwrtmawr, was appointed Principal of the University College, Aberystwyth, at the expense of Thomas Jones, who was championed by Lord Davies of Llandinam, grandson of David Davies.

With Vaughan Davies known to be a supporter of Lloyd George, it was natural that Lloyd George looked to him to boost his support in the House of Lords and awarded him a peerage in the New Years' Honours list in 1921. Although he would have preferred to be called 'Lord Ceredigion', the Garter King of Arms refused this as an inappropriate title for a Baron, and so Vaughan Davies took his title from the River Ystwyth which ran past his home. The peerage created a vacancy in a historically Liberal seat and the Asquithites decided to take the Lloyd Georgeites on in their 'backyard' in what became a memorable by-election.

Ernest Evans, who asserted on his election posters that he was 'THE Liberal candidate', was a Barrister from Aberystwyth and had been Private Secretary to Lloyd George himself, and therefore had the blessing of the Coalition and official support from the Conservatives. A number of possible Asquithian Liberal candidates were approached to contest the seat against Evans and eventually the choice fell upon W. Llewelyn Williams who was sponsored by the Asquithite 'Welsh Liberal Federation'. No other candidate stood and in the straight fight, Evans won with a majority of 3,590 (14.6%).

Evans held on as a 'National Liberal' (as Lloyd George's supporters called themselves) in the 1922 general election but with a slim majority of 515 votes (2.0%) over Rhys Hopkin Morris.

The sudden shotgun merger of the two factions in the Liberal Party led to Evans getting the official approval of the unified party for the 1923 election. However, the Conservatives decided to fight and this deprived him of their votes. Hopkin Morris decided to fight again as an unofficial Liberal and won with a 5,078 vote majority. Hopkin Morris was lucky to survive the 1924 election, a disaster for the Liberals, by being returned unopposed.

The first Labour Party candidate stood against Rhys Hopkin Morris at the 1931 general election and polled 24% of the vote in a straight fight against Morris, who had a 13,752 (52.0%) majority.

In 1932, Morris left Parliament temporarily (he was later to return as MP for Carmarthen) when he was appointed as a Metropolitan Police magistrate. The byelection on 22 September 1932 saw the first three-way fight between the parties, but was won by Owen Evans for the Liberals. Like many of the Liberal MPs he had been a barrister. Evans died shortly before the 1945 general election, but the seat was easily held by his successor Roderic Bowen. Unusually the Labour vote actually fell in percentage terms compared with the previous election despite the Labour landslide in the country at large.

=== Labour challenge (1950–1972) ===
Labour established itself as the main challenger to the Liberals at the 1950 general election in a three-way contest, and the Conservatives opted out of the contest thereafter until 1964. This was partly a move to keep the seat from going Labour. Plaid Cymru first fought the seat in 1959 and kept their deposit (just, with 12.8% of the vote).

With a four-way contest involving the Conservatives and Plaid Cymru at the 1964 general election, and a national swing to Labour, Roderic Bowen suffered a precipitate decline in his share of the vote to only 38.4%; he was re-elected with a majority of 2,219 (7.4%) over Labour. After the death of the Speaker in 1965, Bowen accepted the offer to become a Deputy Speaker, which prevented him from speaking on behalf of his constituency. For the 1966 election, Labour selected Elystan Morgan who had been a member of Plaid Cymru until 1964; with a further national swing and Morgan making a credible bid for the Welsh-speaking vote, Labour won the seat by 523 votes.

=== 1974 onwards ===
In boundary changes in 1983, the constituency was merged with a northern area of Pembrokeshire and also took a Welsh version of its name, becoming known as Ceredigion and Pembroke North.

Ceredigion was recreated for the 1997 election as it reverted to its former borders, having lost the part of North Pembrokeshire in boundary changes.

Mark Williams, first elected in 2005, was the first non-Welsh speaking Member of Parliament elected to represent the constituency since Bowen Rowlands (MP from 1886 until 1892, who declared at a meeting in Aberystwyth when adopted as candidate that he could not speak Welsh). At the 2010 general election, he received a massive increase in his vote, polling over 50% of the votes cast and raising his majority from 219 to 8,324 over the Plaid Cymru candidate, Penri James.

In 2015, Williams suffered a decline of over 14% in his vote share, in common with other Liberal Democrat incumbents across the UK. However, after a campaign which made national headlines due to prior controversial comments by both the Plaid Cymru and Labour candidates, Plaid Cymru were unable to capitalise as their vote share went down slightly. The Conservative vote also declined, while UKIP, Labour and the Greens all improved on their 2010 performance. Williams retained the seat to become the only Liberal Democrat MP in Wales, and one of only eight across the UK.

In 2017, Williams lost his seat to Ben Lake by 104 votes (0.2%). Labour moved from fifth to third in the seat and were roughly 3,000 votes behind Williams and Lake, their best result in Ceredigion since 1997, and the Tories fell to fourth but increased their vote by more than 3,000. The 29.2% won by Plaid Cymru in 2017 was the lowest winning vote share of the election and the only seat won with less than 30% of the vote. At the 2019 General Election Lake substantially increased both his majority and vote share, with the Liberal Democrats falling to third place.

== Members of Parliament ==
=== MPs 1541–1640 ===
Parliament	Member
1541–1543	Morgan ap Rice ap Philip
1543–1544	Thomas Gynns
1545–1547	David ap Llewellin Lloid of Llan Dissill
1547	William Devereux
1553 (Mar)	James Williams
1553 (Oct)	John Pryse II
1554 (Apr)	John Pryse II
1554 (Nov)	James Williams
1555	Sir Henry Jones of Abermarlais
1558	Sir Henry Jones of Abermarlais
1563	John Pryse
1571	John Pryse
1572	John Pryse
1584	Richard Pryse
1586	Griffith Lloyd
1588	Richard Pryse
1593	Richard Pryse
1597	Thomas Pryse
1601	Richard Pryse
1604–1611	Sir John Lewis
1614–1622	Sir Richard Pryse
1625–1629	James Lewis
1629–1640	No Parliaments summoned

=== MPs after 1640 ===
Short Parliament

- 1640: James Lewis

Long Parliament

- 1640–1644: Walter Lloyd (Royalist) – disabled to sit, 5 February 1644
- 1646–1648: Sir Richard Pryse, 1st Baronet – excluded in Pride's Purge, December 1648

Cardiganshire was unrepresented in the Barebones Parliament

First Protectorate Parliament

- 1654–1655: Col. James Philipps
- 1654–1655: Rev. Jenkin Lloyd

Second Protectorate Parliament

- 1656: Col. James Philipps
- 1656–1658: Col. John Clark
- 1656–1658: James Lewis

Third Protectorate Parliament

- 1659: Col. James Philipps

Year	Member	Party
April 1660	Sir Richard Pryse, 2nd Baronet	
1661	Sir John Vaughan	
1669	Edward Vaughan	
1685	John Lewis	
1690	Sir Carbery Pryse, 4th Baronet (died 1694)	
1694	John Vaughan, 1st Viscount Lisburne	
1698	John Lewis	
February 1701	Sir Humphrey Mackworth	
December 1701	Lewis Pryse	Tory
1702	Sir Humphrey Mackworth	
1705	John Pugh	
1708	Lewis Pryse	Tory
1710	Sir Humphrey Mackworth	
1713	Thomas Johnes	Whig
1715	Lewis Pryse	Tory
1718	Owen Brigstocke	
1722	Francis Cornwallis	Tory
1727	John Vaughan, 2nd Viscount Lisburne	Whig
1734	Walter Lloyd (1678–1747)	Whig
1742	Thomas Powell	Tory
1747	John Lloyd	Whig
1755	Hon. Wilmot Vaughan	
1761	John Pugh Pryse	
1768	Wilmot Vaughan, 1st Earl of Lisburne	Tory
1796	Thomas Johnes	Whig
1816	William Edward Powell	Tory
1834	William Edward Powell	Conservative
1854 by-election	Ernest Vaughan, 4th Earl of Lisburne	Conservative
1859	William Thomas Rowland Powell	Conservative
1865	Sir Thomas Lloyd, 1st Baronet	Liberal
1868	Evan Mathew Richards	Liberal
1874	Thomas Edward Lloyd	Conservative
1880	Lewis Pugh Pugh	Liberal
1885	David Davies	Liberal
1886	William Bowen Rowlands	Liberal
1895	Matthew Vaughan-Davies	Liberal
1916	Matthew Vaughan-Davies	Coalition Liberal
1921 by-election	Ernest Evans	Coalition Liberal
1922	Ernest Evans	National Liberal
Nov 1923	Ernest Evans	Liberal
Dec 1923	Rhys Hopkin Morris	Independent Liberal
1924	Rhys Hopkin Morris	Liberal
1932 by-election	Owen Evans	Liberal
1945	Roderic Bowen	Liberal
1966	Elystan Morgan	Labour
1974	Geraint Howells	Liberal
1983	Seat abolished; see Ceredigion and Pembroke North	
1997	Seat recreated	
1997	Cynog Dafis	Plaid Cymru
2000 by-election	Simon Thomas	Plaid Cymru
2005	Mark Williams	Liberal Democrat
2017	Ben Lake	Plaid Cymru
2024	Constituency abolished	

== Elections ==
=== Elections in the 19th century ===
==== Elections in the 1830s ====
General election 1830: Cardiganshire
Party	Candidate	Votes	%	±%
Tory	William Edward Powell	Unopposed		
Registered electors				
Tory hold				

General election 1831: Cardiganshire
Party	Candidate	Votes	%	±%
Tory	William Edward Powell	Unopposed		
Registered electors				
Tory hold				

General election 1832: Cardiganshire
Party	Candidate	Votes	%	±%
Tory	William Edward Powell	Unopposed		
Registered electors		1,184		
Tory hold				

General election 1835: Cardiganshire
Party	Candidate	Votes	%	±%
Conservative	William Edward Powell	Unopposed		
Registered electors		1,352		
Conservative hold				

General election 1837: Cardiganshire
Party	Candidate	Votes	%	±%
Conservative	William Edward Powell	Unopposed		
Registered electors		1,788		
Conservative hold				

==== Elections in the 1840s ====
General election 1841: Cardiganshire
Party	Candidate	Votes	%	±%
Conservative	William Edward Powell	Unopposed		
Registered electors		2,060		
Conservative hold				

General election 1847: Cardiganshire
Party	Candidate	Votes	%	±%
Conservative	William Edward Powell	Unopposed		
Registered electors		2,278		
Conservative hold				

==== Elections in the 1850s ====
General election 1852: Cardiganshire
Party	Candidate	Votes	%	±%
Conservative	William Edward Powell	Unopposed		
Registered electors		2,235		
Conservative hold				

1854 Cardiganshire by-election
Party	Candidate	Votes	%	±%
Conservative	Ernest Vaughan	Unopposed		
Registered electors				
Conservative hold				

General election 1857: Cardiganshire
Party	Candidate	Votes	%	±%
Conservative	Ernest Vaughan	Unopposed		
Registered electors		2,723		
Conservative hold				

General election 1859: Cardiganshire
Party	Candidate	Votes	%	±%
Conservative	William Thomas Rowland Powell	1,070	53.6	N/A
Liberal	Arthur Henry Saunders Davies	928	46.4	N/A
Majority		142	7.2	N/A
Turnout		1,998	77.3	N/A
Registered electors		2,586		
Conservative hold		Swing	N/A	

==== Elections in the 1860s ====
General election 1865: Cardiganshire
Party	Candidate	Votes	%	±%
Liberal	Thomas Lloyd	1,510	56.8	N/A
Liberal	David Davies	1,149	43.2	N/A
Majority		361	13.6	N/A
Turnout		2,659	75.5	−1.8
Registered electors		3,520		
Liberal gain from Conservative		Swing	N/A	

General election 1868: Cardiganshire
Party	Candidate	Votes	%	±%
Liberal	Evan Matthew Richards	2,074	52.0	N/A
Conservative	Edmund Mallet Vaughan	1,918	48.0	N/A
Majority		156	4.0	−9.6
Turnout		3,992	78.0	+2.5
Registered electors		5,115		
Liberal hold		Swing		

==== Elections in the 1870s ====
General election 1874: Cardiganshire
Party	Candidate	Votes	%	±%
Conservative	Thomas Edward Lloyd	1,850	53.1	+5.1
Liberal	Evan Matthew Richards	1,635	46.9	−5.1
Majority		215	6.2	N/A
Turnout		3,485	78.5	+0.5
Registered electors		4,438		
Conservative gain from Liberal		Swing	+5.1	

==== Elections in the 1880s ====
General election 1880: Cardiganshire
Party	Candidate	Votes	%	±%
Liberal	Lewis Pugh Pugh	2,406	60.0	+13.1
Conservative	Thomas Edward Lloyd	1,605	40.0	−13.1
Majority		801	20.0	N/A
Turnout		4,011	82.2	+3.7
Registered electors		4,882		
Liberal gain from Conservative		Swing	+13.1	

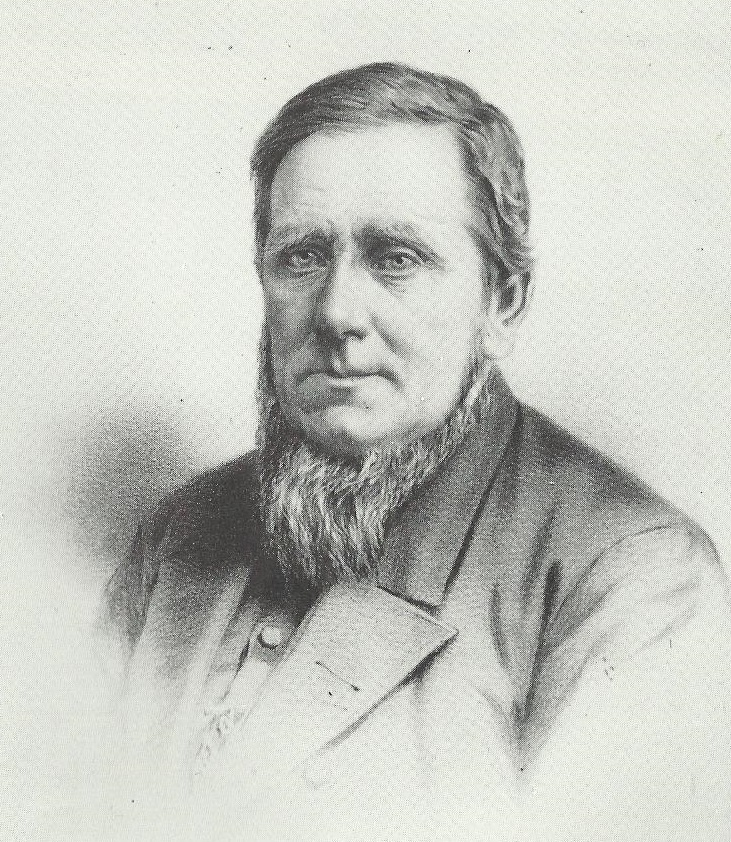
Davies

General election 1885: Cardiganshire
Party	Candidate	Votes	%	±%
Liberal	David Davies	5,967	62.1	+2.1
Conservative	Matthew Vaughan-Davies	3,644	37.9	−2.1
Majority		2,323	24.2	+4.2
Turnout		9,611	78.1	−4.1
Registered electors		12,308		
Liberal hold		Swing	+2.1	

General election 1886: Cardiganshire
Party	Candidate	Votes	%	±%
Liberal	William Bowen Rowlands	4,252	50.1	−12.0
Liberal Unionist	David Davies	4,243	49.9	+12.0
Majority		9	0.2	−24.0
Turnout		8,495	69.0	−9.1
Registered electors		12,308		
Liberal hold		Swing	-12.0	

==== Elections in the 1890s ====
General election 1892: Cardiganshire
Party	Candidate	Votes	%	±%
Liberal	William Bowen Rowlands	5,233	61.5	+11.4
Liberal Unionist	William Jones	3,270	38.5	−11.4
Majority		1,963	23.0	+22.8
Turnout		8,503	64.6	−4.4
Registered electors		13,155		
Liberal hold		Swing	+11.4	

1893 Cardiganshire by-election
Party	Candidate	Votes	%	±%
Liberal	William Bowen Rowlands	Unopposed		
Registered electors				
Liberal hold				

Rowlands is appointed Recorder of Swansea, requiring a by-election.

General election 1895: Cardiganshire
Party	Candidate	Votes	%	±%
Liberal	Matthew Vaughan-Davies	4,927	56.8	−4.7
Conservative	John Harford	3,748	43.2	+4.7
Majority		1,179	13.6	−9.4
Turnout		8,675	66.8	+2.2
Registered electors		12,994		
Liberal hold		Swing	-4.7	

=== Elections in the 20th century ===
==== Elections in the 1900s ====
Vaughan-Davies

General election 1900: Cardiganshire
Party	Candidate	Votes	%	±%
Liberal	Matthew Vaughan-Davies	4,568	54.7	−2.1
Conservative	John Harford	3,787	45.3	+2.1
Majority		781	9.4	−4.2
Turnout		8,355	62.8	−4.0
Registered electors		13,299		
Liberal hold		Swing	-2.1	

General election 1906: Cardiganshire
Party	Candidate	Votes	%	±%
Liberal	Matthew Vaughan-Davies	5,829	66.3	+11.6
Liberal Unionist	C E D M Richardson	2,960	33.7	−11.6
Majority		2,869	32.6	+23.2
Turnout		8,789	66.5	+3.7
Registered electors		13,215		
Liberal hold		Swing	+11.6	

==== Elections in the 1910s ====
General election January 1910: Cardiganshire
Party	Candidate	Votes	%	±%
Liberal	Matthew Vaughan-Davies	6,348	68.3	+2.0
Conservative	George Fossett Roberts	2,943	31.7	−2.0
Majority		3,405	36.6	+4.0
Turnout		9,291	69.7	+3.2
Registered electors		13,333		
Liberal hold		Swing	+2.0	

General election December 1910: Cardiganshire
Party	Candidate	Votes	%	±%
Liberal	Matthew Vaughan-Davies	Unopposed		
Registered electors				
Liberal hold				

General election 1918: Cardiganshire
Party		Candidate	Votes	%	±%
C	National Liberal	Matthew Vaughan-Davies	Unopposed		
Registered electors			30,368		
	National Liberal hold				
C indicates candidate endorsed by the coalition government.

==== Elections in the 1920s ====
Ernest Evans

1921 Cardiganshire by-election
Party	Candidate	Votes	%	±%
National Liberal	Ernest Evans	14,111	57.3	N/A
Liberal	William Llewelyn Williams	10,521	42.7	N/A
Majority		3,590	14.6	N/A
Turnout		24,631	80.1	N/A
Registered electors		30,751		
National Liberal hold		Swing	N/A	

General election 1922: Cardiganshire
Party	Candidate	Votes	%	±%
National Liberal	Ernest Evans	12,825	51.0	N/A
Liberal	Rhys Hopkin Morris	12,310	49.0	N/A
Majority		515	2.0	N/A
Turnout		25,135	76.9	N/A
Registered electors		32,695		
National Liberal hold		Swing	N/A	

Hopkin Morris

General election 1923: Cardiganshire
Party	Candidate	Votes	%	±%
Independent Liberal	Rhys Hopkin Morris	12,469	46.9	−2.1
Liberal	Ernest Evans	7,391	27.7	−23.3
Unionist	Ernest Vaughan	6,776	25.4	N/A
Majority		5,078	19.2	N/A
Turnout		26,636	81.0	+4.1
Registered electors		32,881		
Independent Liberal gain from Liberal		Swing	+10.6	

General election 1924: Cardiganshire
Party	Candidate	Votes	%	±%
Liberal	Rhys Hopkin Morris	Unopposed		
Registered electors		33,314		
Liberal hold				

General election 1929: Cardiganshire
Party	Candidate	Votes	%	±%
Liberal	Rhys Hopkin Morris	17,127	60.6	N/A
Unionist	E C L Fitzwilliams	11,198	39.4	N/A
Majority		5,969	21.2	N/A
Turnout		28,285	73.1	N/A
Registered electors		38,704		
Liberal hold		Swing	N/A	

==== Elections in the 1930s ====
General election 1931: Cardiganshire
Party	Candidate	Votes	%	±%
Liberal	Rhys Hopkin Morris	20,113	76.0	+15.5
Labour	J Lloyd Jones	6,361	24.0	N/A
Majority		26,474	52.0	+30.8
Turnout		26,474	67.5	−5.6
Registered electors		39,206		
Liberal hold		Swing		

1932 Cardiganshire by-election
Party	Candidate	Votes	%	±%
Liberal	Owen Evans	13,437	48.7	−27.3
Conservative	E C L Fitzwilliams	8,866	32.1	N/A
Labour	D M Jones	5,295	19.2	−4.8
Majority		4,571	16.6	−35.4
Turnout		27,598	70.4	+2.9
Registered electors		39,206		
Liberal hold		Swing		

General election 1935: Cardiganshire
Party	Candidate	Votes	%	±%
Liberal	Owen Evans	15,846	61.1	−14.9
Labour	Moelwyn Hughes	10,085	38.9	+14.9
Majority		5,761	22.2	−29.8
Turnout		25,931	65.1	−2.4
Registered electors		39,851		
Liberal hold		Swing		

==== Elections in the 1940s ====
General election 1945: Cardiganshire
Party	Candidate	Votes	%	±%
Liberal	Roderic Bowen	18,912	63.8	+2.7
Labour	Iwan James Morgan	10,718	36.2	−2.7
Majority		8,194	27.6	+5.4
Turnout		29,630	71.2	+6.1
Registered electors		41,597		
Liberal hold		Swing	+2.7	

==== Elections in the 1950s ====
General election 1950: Cardigan
Party	Candidate	Votes	%	±%
Liberal	Roderic Bowen	17,093	52.2	−11.6
Labour	Iwan James Morgan	9,055	27.6	−8.6
Conservative	G S R Little	6,618	20.2	N/A
Majority		8,038	24.6	−3.0
Turnout		32,766	73.4	+2.2
Registered electors		44,627		
Liberal hold		Swing		

General election 1951: Cardigan
Party	Candidate	Votes	%	±%
Liberal	Roderic Bowen	19,959	67.3	+15.1
Labour	Brynmor Williams	9,697	32.7	+5.1
Majority		10,262	34.6	+10.0
Turnout		29,656	70.6	−2.8
Registered electors		41,977		
Liberal hold		Swing		

General election 1955: Cardigan
Party	Candidate	Votes	%	±%
Liberal	Roderic Bowen	18,907	65.2	−2.1
Labour	David Jones-Davies	10,090	34.8	+2.1
Majority		8,817	30.4	−4.2
Turnout		28,997	72.7	+2.1
Registered electors		39,902		
Liberal hold		Swing		

General election 1959: Cardigan
Party	Candidate	Votes	%	±%
Liberal	Roderic Bowen	17,868	59.0	−6.2
Labour	Loti Rees Hughes	8,559	28.2	−6.6
Plaid Cymru	Gareth W. Evans	3,880	12.8	N/A
Majority		9,309	30.8	+0.4
Turnout		30,307	77.9	+5.2
Registered electors		38,878		
Liberal hold		Swing		

==== Elections in the 1960s ====
General election 1964: Cardigan
Party	Candidate	Votes	%	±%
Liberal	Roderic Bowen	11,500	38.4	−20.6
Labour	D L Davies	9,281	31.0	+2.8
Conservative	Arthur J. Ryder	5,897	19.7	N/A
Plaid Cymru	Gareth W. Evans	3,262	10.9	−1.9
Majority		2,219	7.4	−23.4
Turnout		29,940	78.9	+1.0
Registered electors		37,964		
Liberal hold		Swing		

General election 1966: Cardigan
Party	Candidate	Votes	%	±%
Labour	Elystan Morgan	11,302	37.1	+6.1
Liberal	Roderic Bowen	10,779	35.4	−3.0
Conservative	John Stradling Thomas	5,893	19.4	−0.3
Plaid Cymru	Edward Millward	2,469	8.1	−2.8
Majority		523	1.7	N/A
Turnout		30,443	81.1	+2.2
Registered electors		37,553		
Labour gain from Liberal		Swing		

==== Elections in the 1970s ====
General election 1970: Cardigan
Party	Candidate	Votes	%	±%
Labour	Elystan Morgan	11,063	33.4	−3.7
Liberal	Huw Lloyd Williams	9,800	29.6	−5.8
Plaid Cymru	Hywel ap Robert	6,498	19.6	+11.5
Conservative	David George	5,715	17.3	−2.1
Majority		1,263	3.8	+2.1
Turnout		33,076	82.2	+1.1
Registered electors		40,226		
Labour hold		Swing		

General election February 1974: Cardigan
Party	Candidate	Votes	%	±%
Liberal	Geraint Howells	14,371	40.2	+10.6
Labour	Elystan Morgan	11,895	33.2	−0.2
Conservative	Trefor W. Llewellyn	4,758	13.3	−4.0
Plaid Cymru	Clifford Gregory Davies	4,754	13.3	−6.3
Majority		2,476	7.0	N/A
Turnout		35,778	83.7	+1.5
Registered electors		42,752		
Liberal gain from Labour		Swing		

General election October 1974: Cardigan
Party	Candidate	Votes	%	±%
Liberal	Geraint Howells	14,612	42.2	+2.0
Labour	Elystan Morgan	12,202	35.2	+2.0
Plaid Cymru	Clifford G. Davies	4,583	13.2	−0.1
Conservative	Delwyn Williams	3,257	9.4	−3.9
Majority		2,410	9.0	+2.0
Turnout		34,654	80.5	−3.2
Registered electors		43,052		
Liberal hold		Swing		

General election 1979: Cardigan
Party	Candidate	Votes	%	±%
Liberal	Geraint Howells	13,227	35.6	−6.6
Conservative	I. Emlyn Thomas	11,033	29.7	+20.3
Labour	L John Powell	7,488	20.2	−15.0
Plaid Cymru	Dafydd J. L. Hughes	5,382	14.5	+1.3
Majority		2,194	5.9	−3.1
Turnout		37,130	81.5	+1.0
Registered electors		45,555		
Liberal hold		Swing		

For 1983, 1987 and 1992; see Ceredigion and Pembroke North

==== Elections in the 1990s ====
1992 notional result
Party	Vote	%
Plaid Cymru	13,144	31.0
Liberal Democrats	11,251	26.5
Conservative	10,178	24.0
Labour	7,889	18.6
Turnout	42,462	78.0
Electorate	54,467	

General election 1997: Ceredigion
Party	Candidate	Votes	%	±%
Plaid Cymru	Cynog Dafis	16,728	41.6	+10.7
Labour	Robert (Hag) Harris	9,767	24.3	+5.7
Liberal Democrats	Dai Davies	6,616	16.5	–10.0
Conservative	Felix Aubel	5,983	14.9	–9.1
Referendum	John Leaney	1,092	2.7	N/A
Majority		6,961	17.3	+4.9
Turnout		40,186	73.9	–4.1
Registered electors		54,378		
Plaid Cymru hold		Swing	+2.5	

=== Elections in the 21st century ===
==== Elections in the 2000s ====
2000 Ceredigion by-election
Party	Candidate	Votes	%	±%
Plaid Cymru	Simon Thomas	10,716	42.8	+1.2
Liberal Democrats	Mark Williams	5,768	23.0	+6.5
Conservative	Paul Davies	4,138	16.5	+1.6
Labour	Maria Battle	3,612	14.4	−9.9
UKIP	John Bufton	487	1.9	N/A
Independent Green – Save the World Climate	John Davies	289	1.2	N/A
Wales on Sunday – Match Funding Now	Martin Shipton	55	0.2	N/A
Majority		4,948	19.8	+2.5
Turnout		25,143	46.0	−27.9
Registered electors		55,025		
Plaid Cymru hold		Swing	-2.7	

General election 2001: Ceredigion
Party	Candidate	Votes	%	±%
Plaid Cymru	Simon Thomas	13,241	38.3	−3.3
Liberal Democrats	Mark Williams	9,297	26.9	+10.4
Conservative	Paul Davies	6,730	19.4	+4.5
Labour	David Grace	5,338	15.4	−8.9
Majority		3,944	11.4	−5.9
Turnout		34,606	61.7	−12.2
Registered electors		56,125		
Plaid Cymru hold		Swing	-6.9	

General election 2005: Ceredigion
Party	Candidate	Votes	%	±%
Liberal Democrats	Mark Williams	13,130	36.5	+9.6
Plaid Cymru	Simon Thomas	12,911	35.9	−2.4
Conservative	John Harrison	4,455	12.4	−7.0
Labour	Alun Davies	4,337	12.1	–3.3
Green	Dave Bradney	846	2.3	N/A
Veritas	Iain Sheldon	268	0.7	N/A
Majority		219	0.6	N/A
Turnout		35,947	67.2	+5.5
Registered electors		53,776		
Liberal Democrats gain from Plaid Cymru		Swing	-6.0	

==== Elections in the 2010s ====
General election 2010: Ceredigion
Party	Candidate	Votes	%	±%
Liberal Democrats	Mark Williams	19,139	50.0	+13.5
Plaid Cymru	Penri James	10,815	28.3	−7.6
Conservative	Luke Evetts	4,421	11.6	−0.8
Labour	Richard Boudier	2,210	5.8	−6.3
UKIP	Elwyn Williams	977	2.6	N/A
Green	Leila Kiersch	696	1.8	−0.5
Majority		8,324	21.8	+21.2
Turnout		38,258	64.8	−2.4
Registered electors		59,882		
Liberal Democrats hold		Swing	+10.6	

General election 2015: Ceredigion
Party	Candidate	Votes	%	±%
Liberal Democrats	Mark Williams	13,414	35.9	−14.1
Plaid Cymru	Mike Parker	10,347	27.7	−0.6
Conservative	Henrietta Hensher	4,123	11.0	−0.6
UKIP	Gethin James	3,829	10.2	+7.6
Labour	Huw Thomas	3,615	9.7	+3.9
Green	Daniel Thompson	2,088	5.6	+3.8
Majority		3,067	8.2	−13.6
Turnout		37,416	69.0	+4.2
Registered electors		54,242		
Liberal Democrats hold		Swing	–6.8	

General election 2017: Ceredigion
Party	Candidate	Votes	%	±%
Plaid Cymru	Ben Lake	11,623	29.2	+1.5
Liberal Democrats	Mark Williams	11,519	29.0	−6.9
Labour	Dinah Mulholland	8,017	20.2	+10.5
Conservative	Ruth Davis	7,307	18.4	+7.4
UKIP	Tom Harrison	602	1.5	−8.7
Green	Grenville Ham	542	1.4	−4.2
Monster Raving Loony	Sir Dudley the Crazed	157	0.4	N/A
Rejected ballots		52		
Majority		104	0.2	N/A
Turnout		39,767	75.2	+6.2
Registered electors		52,889		
Plaid Cymru gain from Liberal Democrats		Swing	+4.3	

Of the 52 rejected ballots:

- 41 were either unmarked or it was uncertain who the vote was for.
- 11 voted for more than one candidate.

General election 2019: Ceredigion
Party	Candidate	Votes	%	±%
Plaid Cymru	Ben Lake	15,208	37.9	+8.7
Conservative	Amanda Jenner	8,879	22.1	+3.7
Liberal Democrats	Mark Williams	6,975	17.4	−11.6
Labour	Dinah Mulholland	6,317	15.8	−4.4
Brexit Party	Gethin James	2,063	5.1	N/A
Green	Chris Simpson	663	1.7	+0.3
Rejected ballots		117		
Majority		6,329	15.8	+15.6
Turnout		40,105	71.3	−3.9
Registered electors		56,250		
Plaid Cymru hold		Swing	+2.5	

Of the 117 rejected ballots:

- 87 were either unmarked or it was uncertain who the vote was for.
- 30 voted for more than one candidate.

== See also ==
- Ceredigion (Senedd constituency)
- 1854 Cardiganshire by-election
- 1921 Cardiganshire by-election
- 1932 Cardiganshire by-election
- 2000 Ceredigion by-election
- List of parliamentary constituencies in Dyfed
- List of parliamentary constituencies in Wales

== Sources ==
- Jones, Aled (1994). "Sir John Gibson and the Cambrian News" (PDF). Ceredigion. 12 (2): 57–83.
- Jones, Ieuan Gwynedd (1964). "Cardiganshire Politics in the Mid-Nineteenth Century" (PDF). Ceredigion. 5 (1): 14–41.
- Jones, J. Graham (1994). "The Cardiganshire Election of 1959" (PDF). Ceredigion. 12 (2): 94–105.
- Kilsby Jones, J.R. (October 1865). "Etholiadau Ceredigion a Meirionnydd" (PDF). Traethodydd (in Welsh). XX (4): 488–512.
- Morgan, Kenneth O. (1967). "Cardiganshire Politics: The Liberal Ascendancy 1885–1923" (PDF). Ceredigion. 5 (4): 311–346.
- Palmer, Caroline (2004). "Matthew Lewis Vaughan Davies – ambitious cad or assiduous politician?". Ceredigion. 14 (4): 73–104.
- Leigh Rayment's Historical List of MPs – Constituencies beginning with "C" (part 2)
