= 1854 Cardiganshire by-election =

1854 UK Parliament by-election in Wales

The 1854 Cardiganshire by-election was a parliamentary by-election held on 22 February 1854 for the British House of Commons constituency of Cardiganshire.

== Previous Member of Parliament ==
The seat had become vacant when the constituency's Conservative Member of Parliament (MP), William Edward Powell (16 February 1788 – 10 April 1854) retired from Parliament. He died not long after.

== Candidates ==
Only one candidate was nominated for the by-election.

- Ernest Vaughan (30 October 1800 – 8 November 1873).

Vaughan was a prominent landowner in Cardiganshire and the 4th Earl of Lisburne.

Vaughan's political views and allegiance to the Conservative Party were expected to attract opposition and Thomas Lloyd of Bronwydd was mentioned as a possible candidate. However, Lloyd declined to stand and the Liberals, following the lead of the Pryse family of Gogerddan, chose not to contest the seat.

== Previous result ==
General election 1852: Cardiganshire
| Party | Candidate | Votes | % | ±% |
|---|---|---|---|---|
| Conservative | William Edward Powell | Unopposed | | |
| Registered electors | | 2,235 | | |
| Conservative hold | | | | |

== Result ==
1854 Ceredigion by-election
| Party | Candidate | Votes | % | ±% |
|---|---|---|---|---|
| Conservative | Ernest Vaughan | Unopposed | | |
| Registered electors | | | | |
| Conservative hold | | | | |

== See also ==
- Cardiganshire constituency
- List of United Kingdom by-elections (1847–1857)
