= Thomas Edward Lloyd =

British politician (1820–1909)

Thomas Lloyd MP

Member of Parliament for Cardiganshire
- In office 13 February 1874 – 12 April 1880
- Preceded by: Evan Mathew Richards
- Succeeded by: Lewis Pugh Pugh

Personal details
- Born: Thomas Edward Lloyd; 12 April 1820
- Died: 23 September 1909 Coedmore, Cardigan
- Party: Conservative
- Spouse: Clemena Daniel
- Children: Edith

Thomas Edward Lloyd (12 April 1820 – 23 September 1909) was a British Conservative Party politician. He was Conservative MP for Cardiganshire from 1874 to 1880.

Lloyd belonged to one of the ancient families of Cardiganshire who came into possession of Coedmore (or Coedmawr in Welsh) in the seventeenth century when another Thomas Lloyd married the heiress of the Lewis family who previously owned the estate.

Lloyd was the son of Thomas Lloyd, who served as Lord Lieutenant of Cardiganshire from 1854 until 1857 and his wife, Charlotte, daughter of Edward Longcroft of Llanina. At the Cardigan Boroughs by-election in 1855, Thomas Lloyd nominated the Liberal candidate, John Evans, who suffered a rare Liberal defeat in the seat to the Conservative candidate, John Lloyd Davies.

Lloyd was educated at Rugby School and was called to the Bar at the Middle Temple in 1845. He was a JP for Cardiganshire and neighbouring Carmarthenshire.

Lloyd married Clemena Daniel in 1850, and they had one daughter, Edith.

== The 1874 general election ==
When a general election was called at short notice in early 1874, Lloyd emerged as an unexpected Conservative candidate for Cardiganshire, and won a surprise victory which was greeted with consternation and surprise in the Liberal ranks. The sitting Liberal member, Evan Mathew Richards, had won the seat in 1868 in a contest heavily influenced by allegations of coercion, and the introduction of the secret ballot was expected to make the seat safe for the Liberals.

Lloyd's choice was unexpected because he was not a prominent landowner and his estate only comprised 450 acres. However, he was a strong choice in many ways. His father, Thomas Lloyd of Coedmore was regarded as a Liberal rather than a Conservative. Lloyd had also not been involved in conflict with his tenantry, and his candidacy would not therefore attract the same degree of opposition as would face one of the more prominent landowners.

There were suggestions early in the campaign that the contest would be closer than might be expected, as the Liberals had not expected a contest, or at least a contest against a plausible candidate. Lloyd's candidacy was kept a closely guarded secret until nomination day, although his leaflets and campaign literature had been printed. The Liberal leaders in the county were unaware that they would be opposed until Lloyd's address, in which he described himself as a Liberal-Conservative, was published the morning of the nomination day. In later years, there were allegations of irregularities, and that a ballot box had been tampered with when kept overnight at Aberaeron.

In 1880, Lloyd was defeated by Lewis Pugh Pugh of Abermad, who was related to the Pryse family of Gogerddan. He played little part in public life thereafter and seldom attended any meetings of the magistracy following the formation of Cardiganshire County Council in 1889.

== Later life and death ==
Following his electoral defeat, Lloyd played little part in the public life of Cardiganshire and ran a household in London as well as at Coedmore. In 1881, he resided at Victoria Street, Westminster.

Lloyd's wife, Clemena, died in 1882. On 27 August 1885, Lloyd married Eliza Mary Bennett at St Thomas Church, Portland Square, London.

In December 1895, his daughter, Edith, married Albert Coghlan who had previously been employed as a groom at Coedmore. Coghlan died in 1898. Edith died in 1908.

Lloyd lived in retirement at Coedmore until his death, aged 89, on 23 September 1909. On the evening of 27 September his remains were taken from Coedmore to Cilgerran Station from where they were transported to London for cremation according to his wishes. His second wife, Eliza, lived on at Coedmore until her death in 1947.

== Sources ==
- Morgan, Kenneth O (1991). Wales in British Politics 1868–1922 (3rd ed.). Cardiff: University of Wales Press. ISBN 0708311245.

Parliament of the United Kingdom
Preceded by Evan Matthew Richards	Member of Parliament for Cardiganshire; 1874–1880	Succeeded by Lewis Pugh Pugh
