= 1921 Cardiganshire by-election =

1921 UK Parliament by-election in Wales

← 1918	18 February 1921	1922 →

Candidate	Evans	Williams
Party	National Liberal	Liberal
Popular vote	14,111	10,521
Percentage	57.3%	42.7%
MP before election
Vaughan-Davies
Liberal
Subsequent MP
Evans
National Liberal

The 1921 Cardiganshire by-election was a parliamentary by-election held for the British House of Commons constituency of Cardiganshire on 18 February 1921. The election was important for the bitterness of the contest between the Coalition and Independent factions within the Liberal Party and the deepening of this division within the party as a factor in the long-term decline of Liberalism in Wales.

== Vacancy ==
The by-election was caused by the desire of Prime Minister David Lloyd George to find a Parliamentary seat for his private secretary Captain Ernest Evans. Lloyd George persuaded the sitting Coalition Liberal MP, Matthew Vaughan-Davies, who had represented the constituency for more than twenty-five years, to accept a peerage so creating an opportunity for Evans to enter Parliament.

== Candidates ==
=== Coalition Liberals and Unionists ===
Unsurprisingly the Coalition Liberals chose Ernest Evans as their candidate. Evans was a lawyer. He had been called to the Bar in 1910 and after the First World War he became private secretary to Lloyd George. He held that post until 1920. Evans was supported by Lloyd George's Unionist partners in the Coalition government.

=== Liberal split ===
At first it was reported that Evans might not be opposed as he was a Cardiganshire man; his father was Clerk to the County Council. However, the local Liberal Association was representative of both Coalition and Independent Liberal wings of the party and neither group had a permanent advantage over the other. Attempts by those opposed to the Coalition had earlier tried to ensure that any replacement for Vaughan-Davies would not be another Coalition Liberal but although this resolution passed the executive committee, it was never ratified by the membership. Once Vaughan–Davies' peerage was announced, a number of other possible by-election candidates put their names forward. First it was announced that Sir Lewes Loveden Pryse, a local land owner, would stand in the by-election as a Liberal Anti-Waste candidate. A number of by-elections at this time were contested by members of the Anti-Waste League, a political party founded in 1921 by Lord Rothermere. The party campaigned against what they saw as excessive government spending. It is not clear if Loveden Pryse was formally connected to the Anti-Waste League or if he just taking advantage of a well-known political position close to his own views.

To resolve the issue of its choice of candidate, the Cardiganshire Liberal Association invited five potential candidates to address a meeting of the Association and to invite them to accept the outcome of the democratic decision, to use the secretary of the Association as their election agent, and to state if they were Coalitionists or 'free and independent Liberals'. These men were Evans, Loveden Pryse, W. Llewelyn Williams, KC the former MP for Carmarthen and Recorder of Cardiff and two local Aldermen, J M Howell and D C Roberts. Howell refused to attend the meeting and announced that he supported Lloyd George. In the meantime at a meeting in London of the newly formed Welsh Independent Liberal Association, attended by Llewelyn Williams, it was decided that if Cardiganshire Liberals chose a Coalition Liberal candidate, they would oppose him. As the other possible candidates dropped out of contention, the choice for Cardiganshire Liberals crystallised between Evans and Llewelyn Williams. Evans declared that if the Association selected a candidate who would not support the Coalition, he would stand anyway.

In the event, at a rowdy meeting, Cardiganshire Liberals voted to adopt Llewelyn Williams. Of the 350 delegates invited to the selection meeting on 26 January 1921, 347 attended and voted by a majority of 206 to 127 in favour of Llewelyn Williams.

The election which followed led to the re-emergence of tensions within Cardiganshire Liberalism, which had lain dormant for years, between the rural areas of the hinterland and the middle-class seaside towns. It was in the rural areas that Williams found the greatest levels of support.

=== Labour ===
The Labour Party stated they had a candidate ready to stand if the outcome of the Liberal selection process produced a candidate who was unacceptable to them. It was assumed, that given Labour's opposition to the Coalition, that if Evans was chosen therefore Labour would contest the election. In the end however they chose not to do so and Llewelyn Williams claimed he had secured Labour's wholehearted support in the by-election. He later received the public support of William Harris the organiser of the South Wales Miners' Federation who declared it was the duty of Labour to vote against the present government which, he said, was the enemy of the working man.

== Issues ==
=== Agriculture ===
Agricultural policy was an early issue raised in the election. This was because the Cardiganshire Farmers' Union, a generally pro-Conservative organisation, held a meeting to question Captain Evans and decided to ask all candidates the same series of questions. They wanted to know if the candidates approved of farmers having to give up land to ex-soldiers, if they would support a reduction in the number of government inspectors supervising farmers and their work, particularly those operating under the Wages Boards. Although Loveden Pryse decided not to put himself up as a candidate, the issue of waste and government expenditure was raised in the election. The farmers wanted to know if the candidates would oppose increased spending on education, public health, land settlement and housing. Despite the conservatism of the country people it was reported that Llewelyn Williams was receiving a good reception in the rural areas.

=== Waste ===
Llewelyn Williams picked up the Anti-Waste theme and declared that it was not by returning a tame official of the government that the Coalition could be held to account for its extravagance and its loss of control over the nation's finances.

=== The record of the Coalition and the position of Lloyd George ===
Llewelyn Williams tried to rally traditional Liberal support by emphasising the influence in Lloyd George's government of the Conservatives (who were in the majority in the Coalition). He would be happy to support the Prime Minister he said, when he got rid of the Curzons, Carsons, Balfours and Bonar Laws who only a few years before had been trying to cut his political throat over the Marconi case.

Llewelyn Williams was fiercely opposed to Lloyd George, his one-time friend, whom he had broken with over the issue of conscription in 1916. According to one historian, Llewelyn Williams was paranoid about Lloyd George calling him a "dictator" and a "little devil who plagues us so". He also disliked intensely the government action against nationalist forces in Ireland and the use of the so-called Black and Tans.

Llewelyn Williams sought to counter Evans' credentials as a Cardiganshire man by getting his wife to make an appeal to women voters as a native of the county. This appeal was however decisively trumped by the appearance in the constituency of the wife of the Prime Minister. Mrs Lloyd George made a visit lasting four days in support of Captain Evans when she was received enthusiastically with bouquets and brass bands according to one source and addressed a special meeting of women at Aberystwyth. Her campaigning concluded only on election day itself with a tour of polling stations and a last minute plea for votes published in the Cambrian News.

Evans based his appeal on the reasons for maintaining the Coalition after 1918 and appealed for loyalty to Lloyd George as a great Welshman and war hero. There was an unashamed appeal to patriotism. Mrs Lloyd George told electors that the Germans were anxiously watching the result of the contest and the Cambrian News published a cartoon showing Prussian Militarism trying in vain to woo Miss Cardiganshire away from Lloyd George. Evans associated himself with the points made by Lloyd George at the executive meeting of the Welsh National Liberals on 8 February 1921. These were chiefly, the recognition that the emergency extended into the post-war phase; the need for national unity to face the challenges of the economy and demobilization after the war; the need for unity to enforce the post-war international settlement agreed at the Paris Peace Conference and the moves to find a solution to the question of Home Rule for Ireland. In a letter of support to Evans, Conservative leader Bonar Law also made similar points about the need for national unity and government o be carried on in a non-partisan way. Loyalty to the Prime Minister as a great Welsh figure was also reported to have been a factor in swaying the voters.

=== Religion ===
One topic which was reported to have been a dead issue in the election was the Church question, a policy which for a generation had been the central and burning issue of Welsh politics. Violet Bonham Carter tried to raise the issue in a speech at Aberystwyth, attacking Lloyd George for re-endowing the Anglican Church with taxpayers' money. But it seemed to leave the audience cold. The many sects in the Welsh Nonconformism found themselves divided between the different candidates, a dilemma with which they were highly unfamiliar and perhaps this lack of unity served to lessen the profile and importance of the disestablishment tradition. However, Evans was a Methodist, which was the dominant denomination in the area, as was Mrs Lloyd George while most supporters of Llewelyn Williams were Congregationalists. Ministers of religion frequently appeared on political platforms and political factionalism within the Liberal tradition spilled over into the politics of the chapels both between the demoninantions and within. So religion certainly seems to have been, after all, more of factor than was believed by commentators at the time.

=== Polling day ===
In this respect the Coalition had an advantage. In particular they were able to make use of many more motor vehicles to get their supporters to the poll which was important in a constituency like Cardiganshire which was full of outlying villages and farms. On election day it was said that 250 motor cars, mostly owned by Conservative backers of the Coalition, were brought out for the purpose of ferrying voters to the polling stations and this was a significant factor whereas Independent Liberals could muster only 50 cars in response.

== Result ==
In what was reported to have been an unexpectedly heavy poll of 80%, Captain Evans won the seat for the Coalition by a majority of 3,590 votes.

Ernest Evans

1921 Cardiganshire by-election
Party	Candidate	Votes	%	±%
National Liberal	Ernest Evans	14,111	57.3	N/A
Liberal	W. Llewelyn Williams	10,521	42.7	N/A
Majority		3,590	14.6	N/A
Turnout		24,631	80.1	N/A
Registered electors		30,751		
National Liberal hold		Swing	N/A	

Despite this, the many votes received by Llewelyn Williams, the fact that Cardiganshire Liberal Association had chosen an Asquithian over Lloyd George's candidate and the bitterness engendered in the campaign all sounded a warning to the Prime Minister for the future support of his Coalition and the risks to the unity and the future of the Liberal Party in Wales and beyond. As the historian David Powell has commented "Internecine war of this sort was inevitably damaging to Liberal unity and Liberal morale. It also prevented either Liberal faction from claiming undisputed right to the Liberal name and tradition and was doubly confusing to potential voters at a time when electoral loyalties were in a state of flux." The damage was exemplified by the support Llewelyn Williams received from a number of literary and intellectual figures and from the representatives of organised Labour. Liberal divisions made so public during the course of the by-election undermined the previously unassailable hold the Liberals had had on the Welsh intelligentsia which began increasingly to switch its allegiance to Labour.

== Aftermath ==
Evans retained the seat at the following General Election, again against another Liberal challenger;

General election 1922: Cardiganshire
Party	Candidate	Votes	%	±%
National Liberal	Ernest Evans	12,825	51.0	N/A
Liberal	Rhys Hopkin Morris	12,310	49.0	N/A
Majority		515	2.0	N/A
Turnout		25,135	76.9	N/A
Registered electors		32,695		
National Liberal hold		Swing	N/A	

== See also ==
- List of United Kingdom by-elections (1918–1931)
- United Kingdom by-election records

== Bibliography ==
- Morgan, Kenneth O. (1967). "Cardiganshire Politics: The Liberal Ascendancy 1885-1923" (PDF). Ceredigion. 5 (4): 311–346.
- Palmer, Caroline (2004). "Matthew Lewis Vaughan Davies - ambitious cad or assiduous politician?". Ceredigion. 14 (4): 73–104.
