= Evan Mathew Richards =

Welsh politician (1821-1880)

Evan Mathew Richards MP
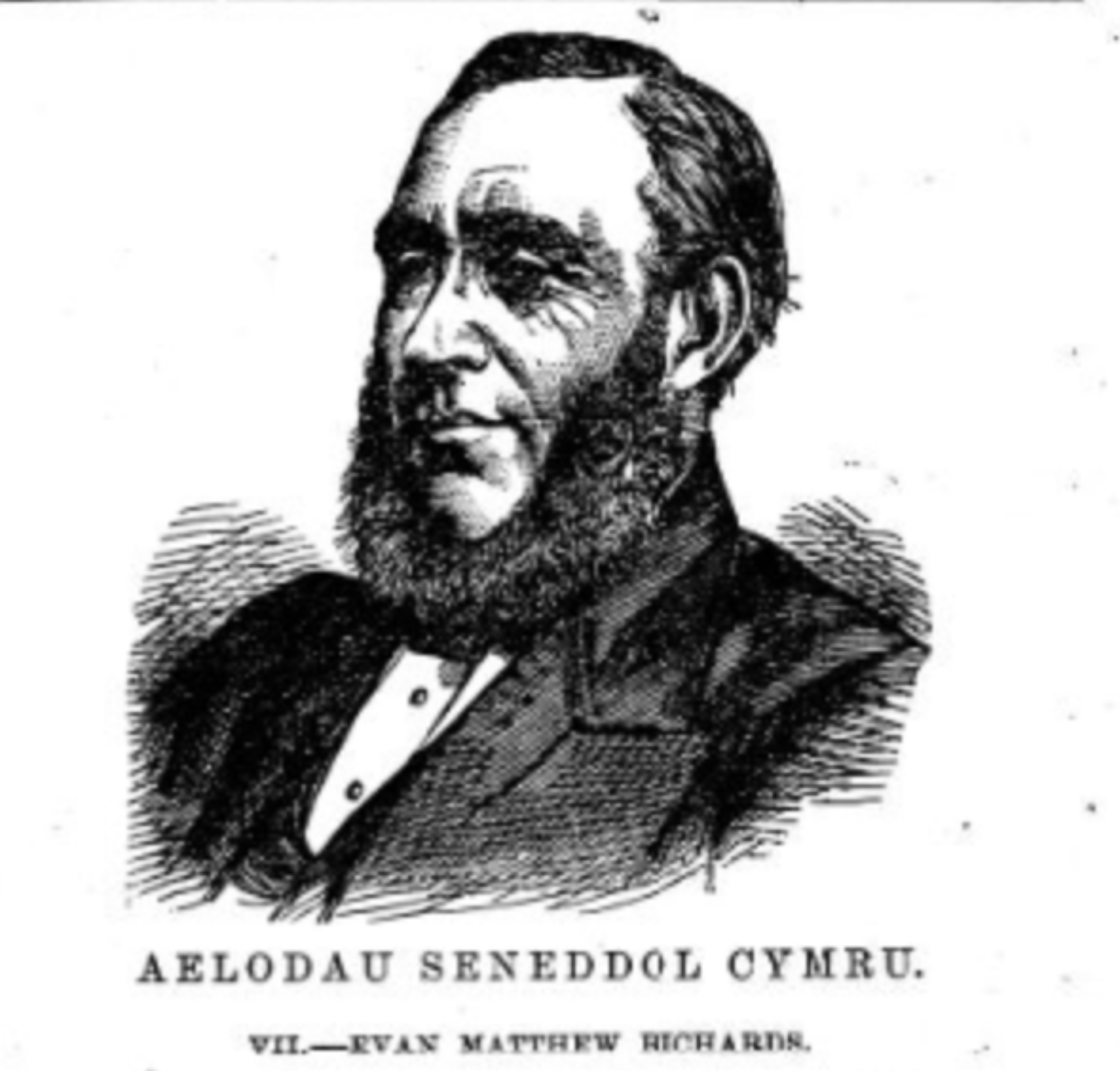

Member of Parliament for Cardiganshire
- In office 1868–1874
- Preceded by: Sir Thomas Lloyd
- Succeeded by: Thomas Edward Lloyd

Personal details
- Born: Evan Mathew Richards; 17 November 1821 Swansea, Wales
- Died: 21 August 1880 (aged 58)
- Party: Liberal
- Spouse: Maria Sloane
- Children: Evan Richards (son)

Evan Matthew Richards (17 November 1821 – 21 August 1880) was a Welsh Liberal politician who represented Cardiganshire in the British House of Commons from 1868 until his defeat at the general election of 1874.

== Early life and career ==
Richards was born in Swansea on 17 November 1821, the son of Richard and Catherine Richards (formerly Thomas). On 11 July 1844 he was married in Birmingham to Maria Sloane, a native of Northamptonshire. They had six sons and one daughter between 1845 and 1862. The eldest children were born in Birmingham but during the 1850s the family returned to Swansea. Richards commissioned a large house in Ffynone Road in Swansea which he named Brooklands; it was completed in 1863.

== Political career ==
=== 1868 election ===
Richards was elected to represent Cardiganshire at the 1868 general election, a contest noted for allegations of landlord coercion. His success in defeating John Vaughan, the Conservative candidate was alluded to the influence of the Pryse family of Gogerddan, leading landowners in the county. He also distanced himself from the Liberation Society which had sponsored the candidacy of Henry Richard in 1865.

=== The 1874 general election ===
When a general election was called at short notice in early 1874, Richards initially expected an unopposed return, but Thomas Edward Lloyd of Coedmore emerged at the last moment as a Conservative candidate, Lloyd was not a prominent landowner and his estate only comprised 450 acres. However, his father, Thomas Lloyd, a previous high sheriff of the county, was regarded as a Liberal rather than a Conservative. Also, Lloyd had also not been involved in conflict with his tenantry, and his candidacy would not, therefore, attract the same degree of opposition as would face one of the more prominent landowners.

Lloyd's candidacy was kept a closely guarded secret until nomination day, although his leaflets and campaign literature had been printed. The Liberal leaders in the county were unaware that they would be opposed until Lloyd's address, in which he described himself as a Liberal-Conservative, was published the morning of the nomination day. In later years, there were allegations of irregularities, and that a ballot box had been tampered with when kept overnight at Aberaeron.

Richards was defeated by 245 votes. The result was greeted with consternation and surprise in the Liberal ranks.

== Sources ==
- Jones, Ieuan Gwynedd (1964). "Cardiganshire Politics in the Mid-Nineteenth Century" (PDF). Ceredigion. 5 (1): 14–41.
- Morgan, Kenneth O. (1967). "Cardiganshire Politics: The Liberal Ascendancy 1885–1923". Ceredigion. 5 (4): 311–346.
- Morgan, Kenneth O (1991). Wales in British Politics 1868–1922 (3rd ed.). Cardiff: University of Wales Press. ISBN 0708311245.
