= John Price (MP for Cardiganshire) =

English politician

John Price (by 1532 – will proved 1584) was a politician.

Price was from the Inner Temple, London and Gogerddan, Cardiganshire. He was a member of parliament for Cardiganshire in October 1553, April 1554, 1563, 1571 and 1572.
