= 1932 Cardiganshire by-election =

1932 UK Parliament by-election in Wales

The 1932 Cardiganshire by-election was a parliamentary by-election held on 22 September 1932 for the British House of Commons constituency of Cardiganshire.

== Previous Member of Parliament ==
The seat had become vacant when the constituency's Liberal Member of Parliament (MP), Rhys Hopkin Morris (5 September 1888 – 22 November 1956) resigned after being appointed a Metropolitan Police Magistrate (a full-time paid magistrate, sitting as a judicial officer at courts in the London Metropolitan Police area).

Rhys Hopkin Morris was born in Maesteg, Glamorgan. He qualified as a barrister in 1919, after serving as an Army officer during the First World War.

Hopkin Morris was an uncompromising adherent of traditional Liberalism. He was unsympathetic to David Lloyd George. As Hopkin Morris said in 1924, "I am not a follower of Mr Lloyd George and I have no intention of being one". He voted against Lloyd George being Liberal leader in 1926 and was the only Liberal MP to vote against Lloyd George's re-election as leader in 1929.

Hopkin Morris had first contested Cardiganshire, as the official candidate of the Liberal Party, in the 1922 general election. He lost to Lloyd George's private secretary Ernest Evans, standing for the National Liberal Party. In the 1923 general election, after the two Liberal factions had re-united, Evans was the Liberal nominee. Rhys Hopkin Morris stood again, as an Independent Liberal, and won the seat. Thereafter he took the Liberal whip and was MP for the seat until resigning in August 1932.

After the by-election, Hopkin Morris served as a Magistrate from 1932 until 1936. He was then appointed to the newly created post of British Broadcasting Corporation regional director for Wales. In that post he argued for Welsh language broadcasting, particularly during the Second World War. After this involvement in broadcasting, between 1936 and 1945, Hopkin Morris returned to politics. He was elected Liberal MP for Carmarthen in the 1945 general election and retained that seat until his death in 1956.

Rhys Hopkin Morris was Deputy Chairman of Ways and Means (a deputy Speaker of the House of Commons) between November 1951 and November 1956. He was knighted in 1954.

== Candidates ==
Three candidates were nominated for the by-election. The list below is set out in descending order of the number of votes received at the by-election.

At the time of the by-election, both the Conservative and Liberal parties were participating in the coalition National government. Despite this coalition both parties nominated a candidate. The Liberal ministers resigned from the National government on 28 September 1932, just six days after the by-election.

1. Owen Evans (5 February 1876 – 11 June 1945) was the Liberal candidate.

Evans was a barrister and company director. After winning the by-election he retained the seat until his death, shortly before the dissolution of Parliament in 1945. He was awarded a knighthood, but died before he was actually knighted.

2. The Conservative candidate was E.C.L. Fitzwilliam, who had previously contested the seat in the 1929 general election.

3. Representing the Labour Party was the Reverend D.M. Jones. He was only the second Labour candidate to contest the constituency.

== Previous result ==
General election 1931: Cardiganshire
Party	Candidate	Votes	%	±%
Liberal	Rhys Hopkin Morris	20,113	76.0	+15.5
Labour	J. Lloyd Jones	6,361	24.0	N/A
Majority		26,474	52.0	+31.0
Turnout		26,474	67.5	−5.7
Registered electors		39,206		
Liberal hold		Swing		

== Result ==
The Liberal Party held the seat with a much reduced majority.

1932 Cardiganshire by-election
Party	Candidate	Votes	%	±%
Liberal	Owen Evans	13,437	48.7	−27.3
Conservative	E.C.L. Fitzwilliams	8,866	32.1	N/A
Labour	D.M. Jones	5,295	19.2	−4.8
Majority		4,571	16.6	−35.4
Turnout		27,598	70.4	+2.9
Registered electors		39,206		
Liberal hold		Swing		

== See also ==
- Cardiganshire constituency
- List of United Kingdom by-elections (1931–1950)
- United Kingdom by-election records
