= Owen Evans (politician) =

British politician (1876–1945)

Owen Evans

David Owen Evans (5 February 1876 – 11 June 1945) was a Liberal Party politician from Wales.

Owen Evans was educated at Llandovery School and the Imperial College of Science. In 1896 he joined the civil service (Inland Revenue Department). Later he read for the Bar and was called to Gray's Inn. He practised law in London until 1916 when he joined the Mond Nickel Company. Rising through the ranks, he eventually became chief administrative officer of the company. He later became vice-president of the International Nickel Company of Canada.

He was elected as Member of Parliament (MP) for Cardiganshire at a by-election in 1932, following the resignation of the Liberal MP Rhys Hopkin Morris. Evans held the seat until his sudden death, probably of heart failure, shortly before the 1945 general election. His death robbed him of becoming a Knight Bachelor; his appointment had been announced in the Dissolution Honours List published on 7 June 1945 but he died before he could be knighted.

In public life in Wales he was a member of the Councils of the University colleges of Aberystwyth and Swansea, treasurer of the college at Aberystwyth and of the National Museum of Wales. He was also a governor and member of the Council of the National Library of Wales.

Parliament of the United Kingdom
Preceded by Rhys Hopkin Morris	Member of Parliament for Cardiganshire; 1932–1945	Succeeded by Roderic Bowen
