= Gwladys Perrie Williams =

Welsh educationist and writer (1889–1958)

Gwladys Perrie Williams (Lady Hopkin Morris) (1889–1958) was a Welsh educationalist and writer. She served as a member of the committee which produced The Newbolt Report (1921) on The Teaching of English. Her spouse, whom she supported while he was reading for the bar at King's College, London, was the Welsh Liberal MP Rhys Hopkin Morris

== Selected works ==
- Williams, Gwladys Perrie. 1915. Li biaus Descouneüs de Renaud de Beaujeu: texte publié avec Introduction et commentaire.
- Williams, Gwladys Perrie. 1918. Welsh education in sunlight and shadow. London: Constable and Company.
- Williams, Gwladys Perrie. 1933. Northox Group Intelligence Test. For ages 11–12 years. [With "Instructions" and a key.]. 2 Ser. G.G. Harrap & Co: London.
