= Roderic Bowen =

British politician and lawyer (1913–2001)

Roderic Bowen QC

Deputy Chairman of Ways and Means
- In office 26 October 1965 – 31 March 1966
- Speaker: Horace King
- Preceded by: Samuel Storey
- Succeeded by: Sydney Irving

Member of Parliament for Ceredigion
- In office 26 July 1945 – 31 March 1966
- Preceded by: Owen Evans
- Succeeded by: Elystan Morgan

Personal details
- Born: 6 August 1913
- Died: 18 July 2001 (aged 87)
- Party: Liberal
- Education: Cardigan County School
- Alma mater: Aberystwyth University; St John's College, Cambridge

Evan Roderic Bowen QC (6 August 1913 – 18 July 2001) was a Welsh lawyer and Liberal Party politician.

== Early life and career ==
Bowen was educated at Cardigan County School, University College, Aberystwyth, where he graduated LLB in 1933, and St John's College, Cambridge, where he was awarded a further first-class degree in law in 1935. He was called to the bar at the Middle Temple in 1937, and became a Queen's Counsel (QC) in 1952. He served in the Army for five years during World War II, reaching the rank of captain.

== Political career ==
At the 1945 general election, Bowen was elected at the first attempt as Member of Parliament for Cardiganshire, succeeding Owen Evans. With only a Labour opponent he comfortably held the seat. He was re-elected in the 1950 general election with the largest Liberal majority at that election, despite facing both Conservative and Labour opposition. During most of the 1950s he was one of a tiny group of only five or six Liberal MPs left at Westminster. He failed to succeed Clement Davies as leader of the Liberal Party in 1956 when Jo Grimond was chosen. Politically, he was on the right of the Liberal Party. During the Suez Crisis, he defended the Conservative Government against opposition "carping criticisms". One of the chief opposition critics of the Government over Suez was his own party leader, Jo Grimond.

Safely returned at the 1959 general election, Bowen's seat was regarded as "the most secure Liberal seat in the whole of the United Kingdom". Even so, it was widely believed that Bowen saw his political career as secondary to his work as a lawyer, a belief that was strengthened by his appointment as Recorder of Cardiff in 1950 and Recorder of Merthyr Tydfil in 1953. His legal work in south Wales resulted in very infrequent appearances in the constituency and his attendance and voting record at Westminster was sporadic.

Bowen's political career came second to his judicial career although he was a President of the Welsh Liberal Federation and member of its council. He was Recorder of Merthyr Tydfil and of Carmarthen. After the 1964 election when Labour's majority in the House of Commons was just four seats, he was persuaded by the Government to accept the position of Deputy Speaker. This put the Labour majority in the House up to five.

His seat remained safe until the 1964 election when a Conservative candidate intervened and Labour cut his majority to around 2,000. At the 1966 general election, he was defeated by the Labour candidate by just 523 votes.

== Post politics ==
He served as National Insurance Commissioner for Wales, 1967–86, and as president of St Davids University College, Lampeter, 1977–92. One of the libraries and a research centre at Lampeter carry his name and Roderic Bowen is also the name of one of the student halls of residence. In 1971-72 he chaired a governmental committee set up to examine road signs policy in Wales.

== Sources ==
- Jones, J. Graham (June 1993). "The Liberal Party and Wales, 1945-79". Welsh History Review. 16 (3): 326–55.
- Jones, J. Graham (1994). "The Cardiganshire Election of 1959" (PDF). Ceredigion. 12 (2): 94–105.
- "Grimond's rival: the life and political career of the Liberal MP for Cardiganshire from 1945-1966, Captain E. Roderic Bowen MP (1913–2001)" by J Graham Jones, Journal of Liberal History, Issue 34/35, Spring/Summer 2002
- Jones, John Graham (2004). "The Cardiganshire Election of 1966" (PDF). Llafur: Journal of Welsh People's History. 9 (1): 95–106.

Parliament of the United Kingdom
Preceded by Owen Evans	Member of Parliament for Ceredigion; 1945–1966	Succeeded by Elystan Morgan
Party political offices
Preceded by Clement Davies	President of the Welsh Liberal Federation; 1948–1949	Succeeded by Emrys Roberts
