= Lewis Pugh Pugh =

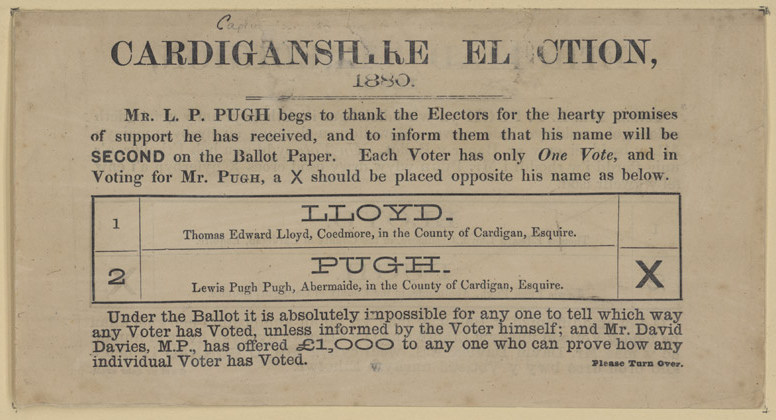
Election advert 1880

Lewis Pugh Evans Pugh (born Lewis Pugh Evans: 3 August 1837 – 6 January 1908) was a Welsh lawyer and Liberal politician who sat in the House of Commons from 1880 to 1885.

Pugh was the son of John Evans of Lovesgrove Cardiganshire and his wife Elizabeth Pugh daughter of Lewis Pugh. He was educated at Winchester College and Corpus Christi College, Oxford. He was called to the bar at Lincoln's Inn in 1862. In 1868 he changed his name to Pugh by royal licence when he inherited the estate of his uncle Lewis Pugh. He was a J.P. and Deputy Lieutenant for Cardiganshire.

In 1870, he was elected a member of the Aberystwyth School Board.

At the 1880 general election Pugh was elected Member of Parliament for Cardiganshire. His prolonged absences in India caused discontent locally. He held the seat until 1885.

Pugh had a distinguished career as a lawyer in India, becoming Attorney General of Bengal. In 1905, he had the house built at Cymerau. He died at the age of 70.

Pugh married Veronica Harriet Hills, daughter of James Hills of Neechindepore, Bengal in 1864. Veronica was the sister of James Hills who won the Victoria Cross in the Indian Mutiny. Family history says her younger brother Charles Hills (1847-1935) was the real father of Hollywood actress Merle Oberon (see Mile MacNair's book).

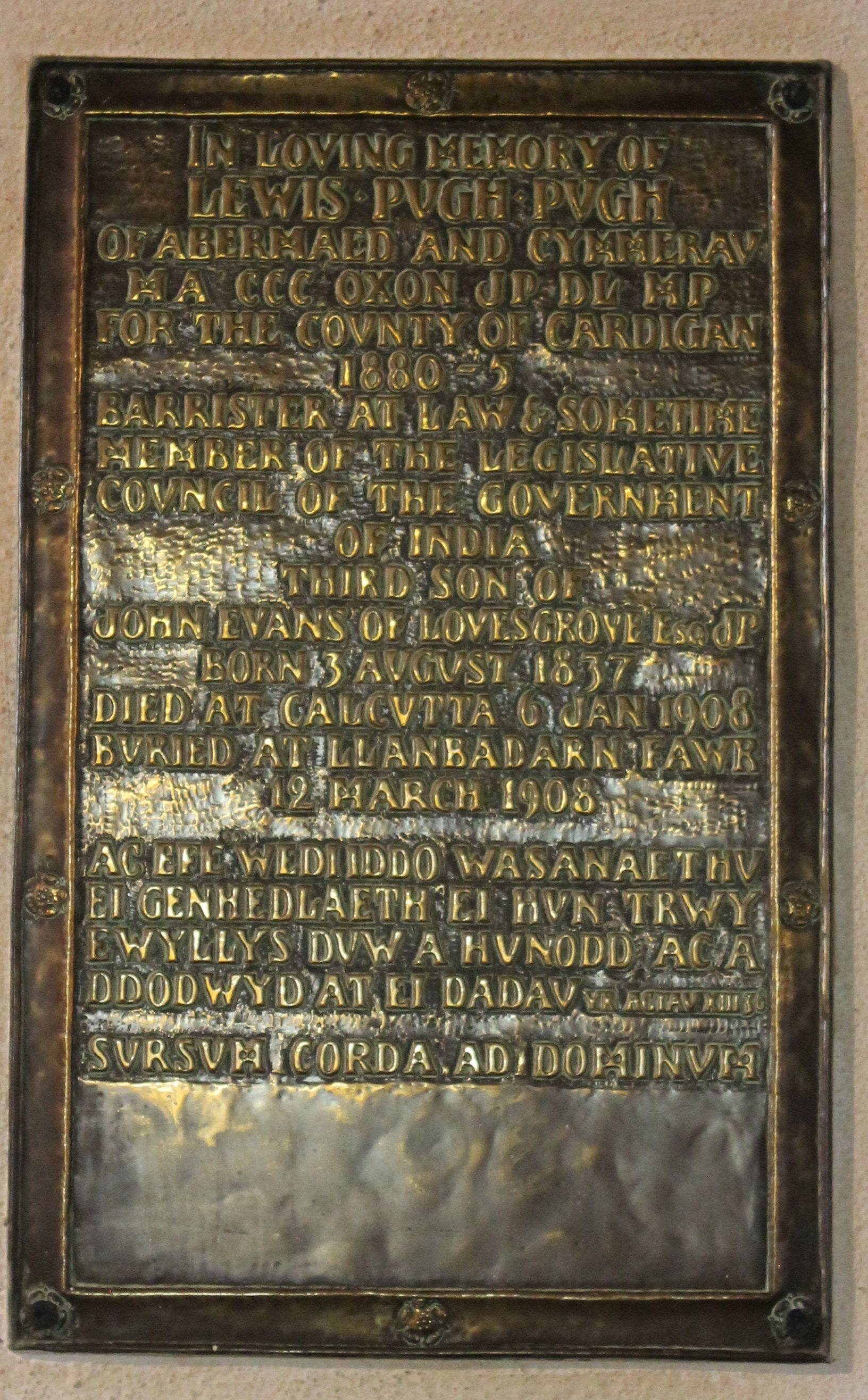
Memorial Llanilar Church

Parliament of the United Kingdom
Preceded by Thomas Edward Lloyd	Member of Parliament for Cardiganshire; 1880 – 1885	Succeeded by David Davies
