= Sir Thomas Lloyd, 1st Baronet =

British politician (1820–1877)

Sir Thomas Lloyd MP
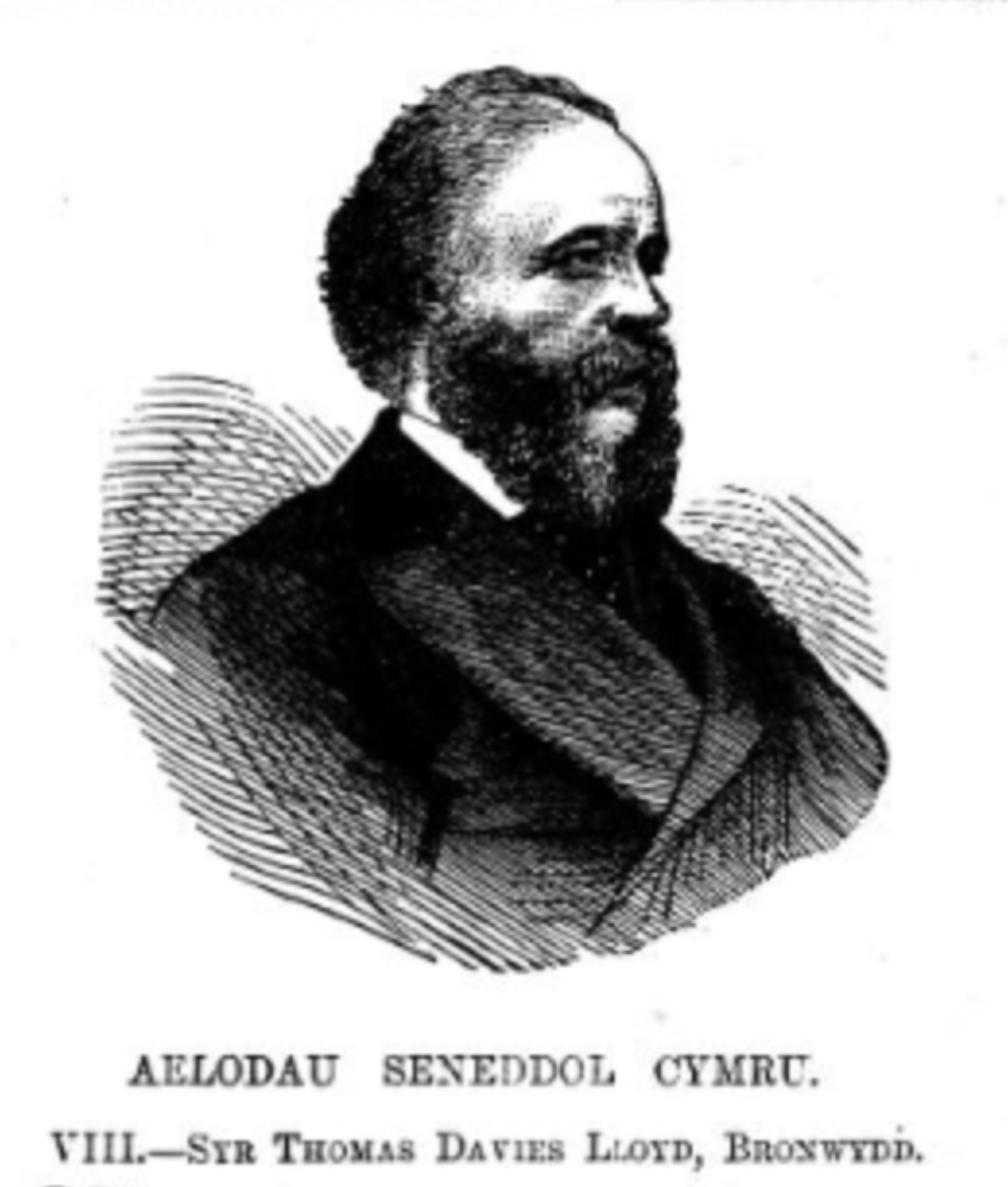

Member of Parliament for Cardiganshire
- In office 1865–1868
- Preceded by: William Thomas Rowland Powell
- Succeeded by: Evan Mathew Richards

Personal details
- Born: 1820
- Died: 1877 (aged 56–57) Bronwydd, Cardiganshire, Wales
- Party: Liberal

Sir Thomas Davies Lloyd, 1st Baronet (21 May 1820 – 21 July 1877) was a British Liberal Member of Parliament, for Cardiganshire (Ceredigion) 1865–1868 and Cardigan Boroughs 1868–1874. Although he coveted a peerage and spent a fortune in pursuit of that aim, he had to be content with a baronetcy.

Lloyd claimed descent from ancient Welsh families and placed great emphasis on these connections. He rebuilt Bronwydd as a Victorian Gothic fantasy 1853–1856. The house is now a ruin, in the process of clearance. Lloyd restored the old castle at Newport, Pembrokeshire as a seat for his Marcher Lordship of Cemais and Llangynllo Church. His chivalric fantasies left the estate deeply in debt.

== Early life ==
He was the son of Thomas Lloyd of Cilrhiwe and Bronwydd, Cardiganshire, who had been the High Sheriff of Cardiganshire in 1814. His mother, Ann, was the daughter of John Thomas of Llwydcoed, Carmarthenshire. His father played an active role in Pembrokeshire politics and nominated Lord Emlyn as member for the county in 1841. He was educated at Harrow School and Christ Church, Oxford. In 1840, he joined the 13th Light Dragoons, and was a commander in Ottawa, Ontario, Canada with the 82nd Foot.

== Landowner ==
Upon the death of his father in 1845, Lloyd returned to Wales, and on 21 January 1846 he married Henrietta Mary, fourth daughter of George Reid, Esquire, of Watlington Hall, Norfolk, and Jamaica. He served as High Sheriff of Cardiganshire in 1851. He inherited the title of 24th Marcher Lord of Cemaes, which gave him authority to hold a Court Leet and other ceremonial occasions such as beating the bounds at Newport, Pembrokeshire. Very little authority rested with these ancient privileges by this time although he has the right to appoint the Mayor of Newport. Lloyd spent a fortune on the renovation of Newport Castle as the seat of his 'marcher lordship' and seeking elevation to the peerage. He had to be content with being created a baronet in 1863.

== Political career ==
Throughout the 1850s, Lloyd was frequently named as a potential candidate for election to the House of Commons, either to represent Cardigan Boroughs or the more prestigious Cardiganshire county constituency. However, he was constantly reluctant to face a contested election, possibly for reasons of cost as his extravagance in rebuilding both Newport Castle and Bronwydd left the estate heavily indebted, but also due to his reluctance to create divisions among the predominantly Conservative landed gentry of Cardiganshire. For several decades, and unofficial understanding saw the county seat had been held by a Conservative while the Whig-supporting Pryse family of Gogerddan held the borough seat. Evatually, Lloyd served for a single term as member for both the county (1865–68) and the boroughs (1868-74)

=== Early political activity ===
An old fashioned Whig Liberal, Lloyd was first mooted as a Liberal parliamentary candidate in 1852, when there was a requisition urging him to contest the Cardigan Boroughs in opposition to Pryse Loveden of Gogerddan. He declined. In 1854, following the resignation of Colonel W.E. Powell who had served as MP for Cardiganshire for 38 years. The Earl of Lisburne emerged as the favoured candidate but given his Conservative political views, there was speculation that he would be opposed by a Liberal candidate. Lloyd was mentioned as the most likely to stand. However, support from the Pryse family of Gogerddan was not forthcoming and Lloyd chose not to contest the seat.

Lloyd was mentioned as a possible candidate for Cardigan Boroughs at the 1857 General Election, in opposition to John Lloyd Davies who had unexpectedly captured the seat at the 1855 by-election. However, Edward Pryse, a member of the influential Gogerddan family chose to contest the seat, and was supported by Lloyd.

Subsequently, a requisition was presented to Lloyd to contest the county seat in opposition to the Earl of Lisburne, and even at a late stage he was expected to go to the poll and is to have a chance of success. However, Lloyd withdrew and Lisburne was returned unopposed.

=== The 1859 General Election ===
In 1859 it was again suggested that Lloyd would contest the county seat. Although scarcely a radical, Lloyd received strong support from the Welsh language radical press. The Aberdare-based Gwladgarwr, for example, deprecated the fact that two Conservatives, namely Colonel Powell of Nanteos and Arthur Saunders-Davies, were contesting Cardiganshire. In Baner Cymru, Thomas Gee was more strident, and strongly supported Lloyd. However, Lloyd again refused the invitation, citing a reluctance to take advantage of a division in the Conservative party in the county. Reluctance to oppose a fellow member of the landed gentry would be a charge levied against Lloyd at the subsequent election. Powell was returned by a fairly narrow margin.

Lloyd, meanwhile, became involved in Pembrokeshire county politics, proposing Sir Hugh Owen of Orielton as Liberal candidate at the by-election held in January 1861. Owen, like Lloyd was in favour of "a slow and safe reform" rather than more radical politics, but was defeated at the election by the Conservative candidate, George Lort Phillips. (Note: In 1841, Lloyd's father had nominated Lord Emlyn as the Conservative candidate for Pembrokeshire. The Lloyds of Bronwydd, like the Owens of Orielton, had migrated towards Liberal politics by the 1860s)

=== The 1865 General Election ===
Prior to the 1865 General Election, Colonel Powell, the sitting member for the Cardiganshire county constituency had indicated his intention to retire. As a leading landowner in the south of the county, Lloyd emerged as the Liberal candidate. However, when Powell reversed his decision, Lloyd issued an address stating that he would not oppose the sitting member. This reflected the fact that the Powell family, with one short interval in the 1850s, had held the county seat since 1816 and their claim to the seat had been widely accepted by the landowners of the county. (Note: In his article on the Cardiganshire election of 1865, widely regarded as the definitive account, Ieuan Gwynedd Jones makes no reference to Lloyd's refusal to oppose Powell in 1859 on the grounds that he did not wish to oppose another member of the landed gentry. The same reasons, presumably, explain Lloyd's temporary withdrawal in 1865) The result was that both Henry Richard and David Davies, Llandinam offered themselves as alternative Liberal candidates. A selection meeting was arranged to be held at Aberaeron, but shortly before this took place, Powell again announced his retirement. Lloyd now stated that he would now fight the seat after all and Richard withdrew in his favour.

David Davies, however, did not withdraw, and proceeded to oppose Lloyd. Davies had a number of advantages, including the employment opportunities created by his railway building schemes. However, Lloyd was supported by those landowners who were associated with the Whig tradition, including Pryse family of Gogerddan who heavily influenced the politics of Aberystwyth. (Note: However, most of the county landowners who attended the Spring Assizes at Cardigan that year, when Lloyd was foreman of the Grand Jury, appear to have played little or no active part in the election.) Also, a significant minority of nonconformists supported Lloyd.

Lloyd won the seat with a majority of 361 votes. Lloyd was ahead in four of the six polling districts, including Cardigan, where Lloyd polled 360 votes against a mere 65 for Davies. Lloyd trailed Lloyd by a narrow margin in the Lampeter district and was only heavily defeated in the Tregaron area, a result attributed to the coming of the railway and Davies's Calvinistic Methodist connections.

Despite his victory, the contest had been a costly one for Lloyd. His opponent was a wealthy man, who had deposited £10,000 in an Aberystwyth bank as "ale money for the battle". After the election, Davies made significant contributions to chapels in the north of the county where Lloyd had won by a small margin. As the next election approached, Lloyd announced that he would not bear the cost of another contested election for the county. He was however prepared to transfer to the borough seat in the event that the sitting member, Colonel Edward Pryse, decided to retire.

=== Member for Cardigan Boroughs, 1868-74 ===
In 1868, Lloyd wished to avoid the financial burden of another contested election. When a Conservative, Ernest Vaughan, nephew of the Earl of Lisburne, announced that he would contest the county seat as a Conservative candidate, a contest was inevitable and Lloyd was determined not to stand even though his erstwhile opponent David Davies offered £500 to start a fund to contest the election.

A few weeks earlier, a Liberal meeting at Aberaeron offered him the opportunity of contesting the county again but at the same time the sitting member for Cardigan Boroughs, Edward Pryse, was obliged to step down to allow Lloyd to be returned for that constituency.

The county seat was in due course won by Evan Mathew Richards and Lloyd served as member for Cardigan until 1874.

By 1873 there were rumours of potential opposition to Lloyd by a wing of the Liberal Party that did not consider his views to be sufficiently advanced. However, David Davies indicated that he would not oppose Lloyd for the boroughs seat.

Lloyd died on 21 July 1877 and was buried six days later in the family vault at Llangunllo church. He was succeeded by his son, Sir Marteine Lloyd, 2nd Baronet.

== Sources ==
=== Books and journals ===
- James & Thomas, 'Wales at Westminster'
- Jones, Ieuan Gwynedd (1964). "Cardiganshire Politics in the Mid-Nineteenth Century" (PDF). Ceredigion. 5 (1): 14–41.
- Kilsby Jones, J.R. (October 1865). "Etholiadau Ceredigion a Meirionnydd" (PDF). Traethodydd (in Welsh). XX (4): 488–512.
- Leslie Baker-Jones, 'The Wolf and the Boar: The Lloyds of Bronwydd Cardiganshire: Lords Marcher of Cemais'

=== Online ===
- Lloyd-Johnes, Herbert. "Sir Thomas David Lloyd (1820-1777), baronet, landowner and politician". Dictionary of Welsh Biography. National Library of Wales.

Parliament of the United Kingdom
Preceded by William Thomas Rowland Powell	Member of Parliament for Cardiganshire; 1865 – 1868	Succeeded by Evan Matthew Richards
Preceded by Edward Pryse	Member of Parliament for Cardigan Boroughs; 1868 – 1874	Succeeded by David Davies
Baronetage of the United Kingdom
New creation	Baronet (of Bronwydd); 1863–1877	Succeeded by Marteine Lloyd
