= Elystan Morgan =

British politician (1932–2021)

The Right Honourable The Lord Elystan-Morgan
- Portrait by Godfrey Argent, 1970

Parliamentary Under-Secretary of State for Home Affairs
- In office 6 April 1968 – 19 June 1970 Serving with David Ennals and Merlyn Rees
- Prime Minister: Harold Wilson
- Preceded by: Dick Taverne
- Succeeded by: Mark Carlisle

Member of the House of Lords
- Lord Temporal
- Life peerage 27 May 1981 – 12 February 2020

Member of Parliament for Cardiganshire
- In office 31 March 1966 – 8 February 1974
- Preceded by: Roderic Bowen
- Succeeded by: Geraint Howells

Personal details
- Born: Dafydd Elystan Morgan; 7 December 1932 Aberystwyth, Wales
- Died: 7 July 2021 (aged 88) Ceredigion, Wales
- Party: Labour
- Other political affiliations: Plaid Cymru (1946–1965)
- Spouse: Alwen Roberts (m. 1959; died 2006)
- Children: 2
- Parent: Dewi Morgan (father)
- Education: University College of Wales, Aberystwyth
- Occupation: Judge; MP

Dafydd Elystan Elystan-Morgan, Baron Elystan-Morgan (7 December 1932 – 7 July 2021), known as Elystan Morgan, was a Welsh politician. He sat as a crossbencher in the House of Lords from 1981 to 2020, and served as a Labour MP from 1966 to 1974.

== Early life ==
Born in Aberystwyth, Morgan was educated at Ardwyn Grammar School, Aberystwyth, and became a member of Plaid Cymru as a schoolboy in 1946. He studied law at the University College of Wales, Aberystwyth, where he was involved with student politics and served as president of the debating union. He qualified as a solicitor and joined a legal firm in Wrexham.

== Political career ==
Early in 1955, Morgan was adopted as Plaid Cymru candidate for the Wrexham constituency and contested the seat at the by-election in 1955, and at the general elections in 1955 and in 1959. In 1964 he was selected to succeed the party president Gwynfor Evans as candidate for Merioneth.

Morgan instead joined the Labour Party and was elected Member of Parliament (MP) for Cardiganshire, Wales, at the 1966 general election, and served as a junior minister from 1968 to 1970, as Under-Secretary at the Home Office. He was chairman of the Welsh Parliamentary Labour Party between 1971 and 1974. In the February 1974 general election, Morgan lost his seat to Liberal candidate Geraint Howells.

In 1979, he sought election as Labour candidate for Anglesey, following the retirement of Cledwyn Hughes, but was defeated by Conservative candidate Keith Best. Following his defeat, he largely withdrew from political life and concentrated on his legal career.

He was admitted to Gray's Inn in 1971, entitled to practise as a barrister. He was created a life peer on 27 May 1981, with the title Baron Elystan-Morgan, of Aberteifi in the County of Dyfed. He held the office of Recorder between 1983 and 1987. Morgan held the office of Circuit Judge between 1987 and 2003. He did, however, return to politics after his retirement in 2006. He was President of the Aberystwyth Old Students' Association in 1995–96.

He retired from the House of Lords on 12 February 2020.

== Political positions ==
=== Welsh devolution ===
Morgan campaigned heavily for Welsh devolution, as he believed that Wales should not legally be seen as a part of England. He believed that Cardiff should have all major governing powers over Wales, save for a few, such as the ability to go to war.

=== Blasphemy laws ===
On 6 March 2007, Morgan supported the abolition of the blasphemy law in the UK, quoting Richard Dawkins's description of God as "a petty, unjust, unforgiving control freak; a vindictive, bloodthirsty ethnic cleanser; a misogynistic, homophobic, racist, infanticidal, genocidal, filicidal, pestilential, megalomaniacal, sadomasochistic, capriciously malevolent bully". A deacon in the Presbyterian Church of Wales at Capel-y-Garn in Pen-y-garn, he was making the point that God did not need the protection of the law.

=== Gay rights ===
Morgan is recorded as having voted against the partial decriminalisation of homosexuality in 1967, although in 1982 he claimed that he had abstained on that vote.

Morgan later supported proposals to expand gay rights, such as the Homosexual Offences (Northern Ireland) Order 1982 and the Marriage (Same-Sex Couples) Act 2013.

== Personal life ==
In 1959, Morgan married Alwen Roberts. They had two children, a daughter called Eleri (born 1960) and a son, Owain (born 1962). Lady Elystan-Morgan died on the 19th of December 2006.

Morgan died in Ceredigion on 7 July 2021 at the age of 88.

== Works ==
- Elystan: atgofion oes (Memoirs) (in Welsh). Tal-y-bont, Ceredigion: Y Lolfa. 2012. ISBN 978-1-84771-327-8.

Parliament of the United Kingdom
Preceded by Roderic Bowen	Member of Parliament for Cardiganshire; 1966 – February 1974	Succeeded by Geraint Howells
Academic offices
Preceded by Melvin Rosser	President of the University of Wales Aberystwyth; 1997–2007	Succeeded by Emyr Jones Parry
Preceded by Sir David Nicholas	President of the Aberystwyth Old Students' Association; 1995–1996	Succeeded by Rachel Bryan Davies
