= William Bowen Rowlands =

William Bowen Rowlands (1837 – 4 September 1906), was a British politician and Member of Parliament.

He was educated at Jesus College, Oxford, matriculating on 22 March 1854 at the age of 18. He was a scholar from 1855 to 1858, obtaining his BA degree in 1859 and his MA in 1865.

In 1864, he was appointed headmaster of a grammar school in Haverfordwest, Pembrokeshire and also curate of Narberth in the same county. He studied law from 1868 at Gray's Inn, and was called to the Bar in 1871. He was appointed QC in 1871 and made a Bencher in 1882.

In 1885 he sought the Liberal candidature for the East Glamorganshire constituency and had some influential supporters such as Idris Williams, Porth. However, he lost the nomination to Alfred Thomas.

In 1886, following the decision of David Davies to join the Liberal Unionists, Rowlands was selected as the new Liberal Party candidate for the Cardiganshire constituency. Initially, he was regarded as an outsider due to the network of supporters that the sitting member had in the county, including his influence within the Calvinistic Methodist denomination. However, superior Liberal organization and the support of the majority of nonconformist ministers, who were widely regarded as having influenced the result through their congregations, allowed Rowlands to capture the seat from Davies by a mere nine votes. It may well be that Rowlands, a non-Welsh speaker, did not expect to succeed, and he showed relatively little enthusiasm for his parliamentary responsibilities and seldom visited the county. He was comfortably re-elected, however, in 1892, when he defeated the Liberal Unionist candidate, Morgan Jones, a Birmingham draper who had the active support of Joseph Chamberlain.

In 1893, Rowlands was appointed Recorder of Swansea which forced a by-election, however, as the only candidate put forward he automatically won. He retired from Parliament at the 1895 General Election.

== Bibliography ==
- Morgan, Kenneth O. (1967). "Cardiganshire Politics: The Liberal Ascendancy 1885-1923". Ceredigion. 5 (4): 311–346.
- http://archive.thetablet.co.uk/article/15th-september-1906/27/the-late-judge-bowen-rowlands

Parliament of the United Kingdom
Preceded by David Davies	Member of Parliament for Cardiganshire; 1886 – 1895	Succeeded by Matthew Vaughan-Davies
