= Morgan ap Rhys ap Philip =

Welsh politician (16th century)

Morgan ap Rhys ap Philip (by 1520 – 1543?), of Llanfihangel, Cardiganshire, was a Welsh Member of Parliament.

He was a Member (MP) of the Parliament of England for Cardiganshire in 1542.

Parliament of England
Preceded by ?	Member of Parliament for Cardiganshire; 1542	Succeeded by Thomas Gynns
