= Ernest Evans (politician) =

Welsh politician

Ernest Evans

Ernest Evans (18 May 1885 – 18 January 1965) was a Liberal Party politician from Wales.

== Family and education ==
Ernest Evans was born at Aberystwyth, the son of Evan Evans, the Clerk to the Cardiganshire County Council and his wife Annie Davies. He was educated at Llandovery College, at the University College of Wales, and at Trinity Hall, Cambridge, where he was President of the Union in 1909. He was also active in Cambridge University Liberal Club, serving as its president between 1908 and 1909. In 1925, he married Constance Anne, daughter of Thomas Lloyd, draper, of Hadley Wood. They had three sons.

== Career ==
On leaving university Evans went in for the law. He was called to the Bar in 1910 and he practised both in London and on the South Wales Circuit. He was sometime chairman of Cardiganshire and Anglesey Quarter Sessions. During the First World War he served with the Royal Army Service Corps in France from 1915 to 1918 and was promoted to the rank of captain.

== Politics ==
From November 1918 until December 1920 Evans served as private secretary to the prime minister David Lloyd George. Matthew Vaughan-Davies, the long-serving Liberal MP for Cardiganshire, was elevated to the peerage as Baron Ystwyth, of Tan-y-Bwlch in the County of Cardigan, in the 1921 New Year Honours, and in February 1921, Evans was elected as Member of Parliament (MP) for Cardiganshire at a by-election representing the Coalition Liberals. He held the seat at the 1922 general election, but was defeated at the 1923 general election by the independent Rhys Hopkin Morris.

Evans did not stand again in Cardiganshire, but at the 1924 general election he defeated the Christian pacifist George Maitland Lloyd Davies to win the University of Wales constituency. He held that seat until 1942, when he was appointed a County Court judge.

== Other appointments ==
Evans was made a KC in 1937 and also served as a Justice of the Peace. He sat as a County Court judge from 1942 until his retirement in 1957. He was a Member of the Council of University College of Wales and of the Council of National Library of Wales. He was President of the Aberystwyth Old Students' Association in 1931–2. He was also a vice-president of the Honourable Society of Cymmrodorion.

== Publications ==
Evans specialised in agricultural law. In 1911, together with Clement Davies, another Welsh lawyer who went on to lead the Liberal Party from 1945 to 1956, he wrote An epitome of agricultural law and he also published on his own the Elements of the law relating to vendors and purchasers (1915) and Agricultural and Small Holdings Act.

== Death ==
Evans died at his home, Traethgwyn, Ffordd Tŷ Mawr, Deganwy, Caernarfonshire, on 18 January 1965, aged 79.

Parliament of the United Kingdom
Preceded by Matthew Vaughan-Davies	Member of Parliament for Cardiganshire; 1921–1923	Succeeded by Rhys Hopkin Morris
Preceded by George M. Ll. Davies	Member of Parliament for University of Wales; 1924–1943	Succeeded by William John Gruffydd
Professional and academic associations
Preceded by Dr William King	President of the Aberystwyth Old Students' Association; 1931–32	Succeeded by Prof. Edward Edwards
