= Bronwydd Castle =

Welsh country house

Coordinates: 52°3′46″N 4°24′14″W

Bronwydd Castle (or simply Bronwydd) was a Welsh country house in Cardiganshire, owned by the Lloyd family. It is just south of Llangynllo/Llangunllo, halfway between Cardigan and Lampeter. Sir Thomas Lloyd, 1st Baronet rebuilt the original 18th-century house in the Gothic Revival style in the 1850s. The family sold the house in 1937 after the death of Sir Thomas' son and daughter-in-law; after World War II the house was stripped of its fittings and has been left in ruins.

== History ==
Bronwydd Mansion Ruins

Bronwydd replaced Cilrhiwe as the main family home in the 1850s, at which time it was rebuilt in the fashionable Gothic Revival style by Sir Thomas Lloyd, 1st Baronet. The architect was Richard Kyrke Penson, who skillfully adapted an existing 18th-century house to create an elaborate Victorian gothic "castle" suitable for the "Marcher Lord" of Cemais. The 18th-century house contained a private chapel, the Lloyds of that era having been converts to Methodism, while the reconstructed Bronwydd included a baronial hall, containing the family muniments and serving as entrance hall. The exterior of the building included a tall, slim round tower and a square tower with bell-turret. Part of the house is supposed to have been modelled on the cathedral transept and tower of the Rock of Cashel, Ireland, although Thomas Lloyd described the whole as 'a romantic Rhineland castle with patterned roof-tiling.' The stables and service block were rendered in mock half-timber, similar to the streets of Chester. The house was sited on a bluff overlooking the river Afon Cynllo.

The interiors were splendid, with painted mottoes above the doors, a profusion of carved stone, stained glass and mural paintings. The expense of such medieval fantasies rested heavy on the estate, which was in debt to the tune of £100,000 when Sir Thomas' son, Sir Marteine Lloyd inherited the estate in 1877. Prudent management and the sale of outlying lands restored some solvency to the estate in the years prior to the First World War. The death of Sir Marteine's son, Arundel Keymes Lloyd in the Great War doomed the estate, however. The Inland Revenue demanded death duties on the estate, which had been made over to Arundel Lloyd in order to avoid those same duties. For much of the post-war period, Sir Marteine and Lady Lloyd lived away from Bronwydd, although they celebrated their Golden Wedding in 1928 in some style.

Sir Marteine Lloyd died in 1933, and Lady Lloyd attempted to let the house, which ended up housing illegal aliens. On Lady Lloyd's death in 1937, the house and grounds were sold. The sale of land close to the mansion for forestry work doomed the house. After housing a Jewish boarding school, Aryeh House School, in the Second World War, and aliens thereafter, the house, then known as Bronwydd Castle, was stripped. Substantial parts of the house remained roofed into the 1980s. The round tower fell in the early years of the 21st century, and much of the house has disappeared.
