= Rhys Hopkin Morris =

Welsh politician (1888–1956)

Sir Hopkin Morris MBE QC JP
- Sir Hopkin Morris, MBE, QC, JP

Deputy Chairman of Ways and Means
- In office 7 November 1951 – 22 November 1956
- Speaker: William Morrison
- Preceded by: Charles MacAndrew
- Succeeded by: Gordon Touche

Member of Parliament for Carmarthen
- In office 26 July 1945 – 22 November 1956
- Preceded by: Moelwyn Hughes
- Succeeded by: Megan Lloyd George

Member of Parliament for Cardiganshire
- In office 6 December 1923 – 24 August 1932
- Preceded by: Ernest Evans
- Succeeded by: Owen Evans

Personal details
- Born: Rhys Hopkin Morris; 5 September 1888 Maesteg, Glamorgan , UK
- Died: 22 November 1956 (aged 68)
- Party: Liberal
- Other political affiliations: Independent Liberal
- Spouse: Gwladys Perrie Williams

Sir Rhys Hopkin Morris MBE QC JP (5 September 1888 – 22 November 1956), was a Welsh Liberal politician who was a Member of Parliament from 1923–1932 and from 1945–1956.

== Early life ==
Morris was born at Blaencaerau, Maesteg, Glamorgan, son of John Morris, Congregational minister in Caerau, and Mary. He was educated at local schools in Glamorgan, at University of Wales, Bangor, where he studied philosophy and graduated in 1912, and at King's College London following World War I, where he read law. Morris served continually in the armed forces during the war, from December 1914 until January 1919, possessing the rank of Lieutenant in the 2nd Battalion Royal Welsh Fusiliers by its end and being twice wounded - the second time seriously. He was mentioned in dispatches and made an MBE (military division). After the war, he qualified as a barrister with special dispensations granted due to his service in the military, and was called to the Bar on 2 July 1919.

His wife, whom he met at Bangor and married in September 1918, was Gwladys Perrie Williams.

== Political career ==
A classic laissez-faire liberal, Morris supported H. H. Asquith against David Lloyd George when the party split between 1916 and 1923, and would remain fiercely opposed to Lloyd George and interventionist Liberalism throughout his political career.

In 1922 Morris contested the general election as a pro-Asquith Liberal in Cardiganshire, narrowly losing to the sitting pro-Lloyd George Liberal MP Ernest Evans. The following year the Liberal Party reunited but Morris ran as an Independent Liberal against Evans. In one of the most surprising results of the 1923 general election Morris was elected. At the follow year's general election he was returned unopposed as the official Liberal candidate.

His opposition to both Lloyd George and the introduction of tariffs resulted in his remaining with the official ("Samuelite") Liberals when the party split three ways in advance of the 1931 general election. The following year Morris was appointed a Metropolitan Police magistrate, a salaried post for which he vacated his seat because the post was an 'office of profit under the Crown' and incompatible with membership of the House of Commons. In 1936, he became the first Regional Director of the BBC in Wales. The same year Morris became President of the London Welsh Trust, which runs the London Welsh Centre, holding office until 1937.

Thirteen years later Morris was returned to Parliament in yet another sensational result. At the 1945 general election he won Carmarthen, taking the seat from the Labour Party's Moelwyn Hughes despite the rest of the country experiencing a Labour landslide. Morris was to hold the seat for the remainder of his life.

In 1951 he became Deputy Chairman of Ways and Means in the House of Commons and thus one of the Deputy Speakers. This post, together with his age, combined to exclude him for consideration for the Liberal Party leadership when Clement Davies stood down in October 1956. Morris died the following month, aged 68.

Throughout his career Morris was a staunch individualist, once summing up his political philosophy as, "There is no man alive who is sufficiently good to rule the life of the man next door to him!" Many have regarded him as being the last representative of traditional Gladstonian Liberalism in the Commons.

== See also ==
- Report of the Commission on the Palestine Disturbances of August, 1929, Cmd. 3530

== Sources ==
- Craig, F. W. S. (1983) [1969]. British parliamentary election results 1918-1949 (3rd ed.). Chichester: Parliamentary Research Services. ISBN 0-900178-06-X.
- Rhys Hopkin Morris: The Man and his Character by T J Evans, (Gomerian Press, Llandyssul), 1957
- Sir Rhys Hopkin Morris by J Graham Jones, in Brack et al. (eds.) Dictionary of Liberal Biography (Politico's), 1998
- Leigh Rayment's Historical List of MPs
- Jones, J. Graham (June 1993). "The Liberal Party and Wales, 1945-79" (PDF). Welsh History Review. 16 (3): 326–55.

Parliament of the United Kingdom
Preceded by Ernest Evans	Member of Parliament for Cardiganshire; 1923 – 1932	Succeeded by Owen Evans
Preceded by Moelwyn Hughes	Member of Parliament for Carmarthen; 1945 – 1956	Succeeded by Megan Lloyd George
