= David Davies (industrialist) =

Welsh industrialist and Liberal politician (1818-1890)

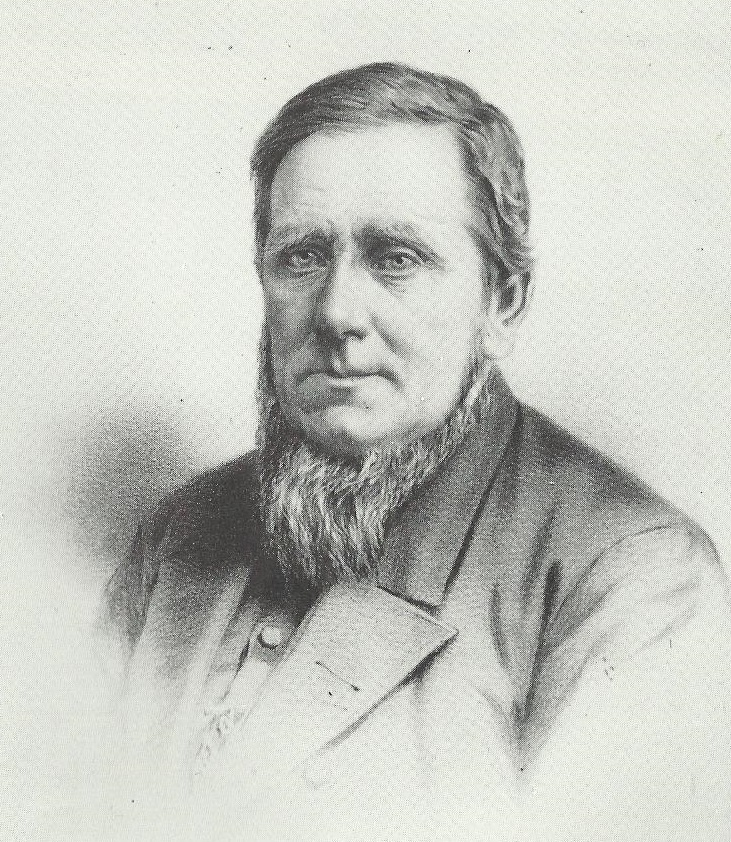
- Davies, c. 1880s

Member of Parliament for Cardigan Boroughs
- In office 1874–1885
- Preceded by: Thomas Lloyd
- Succeeded by: (seat merged)

Member of Parliament for Cardiganshire
- In office 1885–1886
- Preceded by: Lewis Pugh Pugh
- Succeeded by: William Bowen Rowlands

Personal details
- Born: 18 December 1818 Llandinam, Montgomeryshire, Wales
- Died: 20 July 1890 (aged 71) Plas Dinam, Llandinam, Montgomeryshire, Wales
- Resting place: St Llonio's Church, Llandinam
- Party: Liberal

David Davies (18 December 1818 – 20 July 1890) was a Welsh industrialist and Liberal politician who sat in the House of Commons between 1874 and 1886. Davies was often known as David Davies Llandinam (from the place of his birth, Llandinam in Montgomeryshire). He founded Barry Docks.

== Early life and education ==
Davies was the son of farmer David Davies and his wife Elizabeth and the eldest of nine children. He attended the day school at Llandinam but was primarily self-educated. He began work as a sawyer and went into agriculture, working alongside his father, who died when David was aged 20, leaving him to take charge of the family. He was successful from an early age and in 1848 took over a larger farm called Tynymaen, which later became the home farm of the Plâs Dinam estate. Two years later he took over a further holding, Gwerneirin.

== Religion ==
A Calvinistic Methodist by upbringing, Davies was teetotaller and firm about his Sunday observance. (Note: During his unsuccessful campaign in Cardiganshire in 1865, Davies declared in his speech accepting the nomination that he did not open letters on a Sunday.) He became an influential figure in Calvinistic Methodism, which had over 13,000 members in Cardiganshire alone, and funded the building of numerous chapels.

== Political career ==
=== Beginnings: the 1865 Cardiganshire election ===
David Davies first sought election to Parliament at the 1865 General Election when he ran for the Cardiganshire county seat. Prior to the election, the sitting member, Colonel Powell of Nanteos, had indicated his intention to retire and Sir Thomas Davies Lloyd of Bronwydd, a Whig landowner, had announced his intention to stand as a Liberal. However, when Powell reversed his decision, Lloyd issued an address stating that he would not oppose the sitting member. The result was that both Davies and Henry Richard offered themselves as alternative Liberal candidates. A selection meeting was arranged to be held at Aberaeron, but shortly before this took place, Powell again announced his retirement. Lloyd now stated that he would now fight the seat after all and Richard withdrew in his favour. David Davies did not withdraw. Lloyd won the seat with a majority of 361 votes.

Davies had a number of advantages, including the fact that his railway building enterprises benefited the county and created additional, if temporary, employment opportunities. However, his defeat was attributed to the strong opposition of landowners, including the overwhelming influence of the Pryse family of Gogerddan at Aberystwyth, and the failure of nonconformists to unite behind his candidature. However, his intervention represented a direct challenge to the traditional hegemony of the county's landed gentry over the political representation of the county. Ieuan Gwynedd Jones describes the election as 'a contest between two kinds of wealth, the affluent railway contractor pitting his ready cash and ruthless commercial methods against the sedate and comfortable but strained resources of the rural gentry." This was symbolised by Davies depositing £10,000 in an Aberystwyth bank as "ale money for the battle". Davies presented himself as a businessman who brought employment to the county and scarcely referred in his speeches to radical policies, including the secret ballot.

As a Calvinistic Methodist deacon, Davies had envisaged strong support from the nonconformist community. However, there were numerous examples of prominent nonconformists who were lukewarm, or even opposed, to Davies's candidature. The reasons included a reluctance to offend landowners who held the leases to land on which some chapels had been built.

When the result was announced, Davies had polled 1,149 votes against 1,510 for Lloyd. Davies had a large majority in the Tregaron area, which was attributed to the coming of the railway and his Calvinistic Methodist connections. He was also ahead in the Lampeter district. However, he lost the other four districts, including Cardigan, where Lloyd polled 360 votes against a mere 65 for Davies.

Following his 1865 defeat in Cardiganshire, it appears that Davies initially intended to contest the seat again. After the election, he made significant contributions to chapels in the north of the county where Lloyd had won by a small margin. During the months leading up to the 1868 election became clear that Sir Thomas Lloyd did not wish to bear the costs of another contested election. A meeting of prominent Liberals at Aberaeron in late May saw an invitation issued to Davies to contest the county seat if Lloyd declined to do so (with Lloyd been offered the Cardigan Boroughs constituency where he was likely to be returned unopposed). However, Davies declined the invitation and appears to have offered Lloyd, his erstwhile opponent, a gift of £500 to contest the seat.

=== Member of Parliament ===
In 1874, however, Davies was elected as Liberal Member of Parliament (MP) for Cardigan Boroughs and held the seat until 1885, when the county and borough seats were merged under the Redistribution of Seats Act 1885. He was then elected MP for Cardiganshire county seat in 1885. Davies was a poor public speaker, and his speech was described as untutored, but his support in Cardiganshire was nevertheless considerable owing to factors including his patronage of the new university college at Aberystwyth and his connections within the Calvinistic Methodist denomination, which had over 13,000 members in Cardiganshire. His success in 1885 was also underpinned by a particularly effective Liberal Association, organised by H. C. Fryer, an Aberystwyth solicitor, and which set up mechanisms to ensure the registration of voters. Trains were even organised to convey voters who had migrated to the South Wales coalfield back to their native county to cast their votes.

=== Break with the Liberal Party and the 1886 General Election ===
In 1886, however, Davies broke with Gladstone over home rule for Ireland and at the 1886 general election he stood as a Liberal Unionist candidate, having initially indicated that he would retire from politics. A number of his associates such as Robert J. Davies, Cwrtmawr followed him into the Liberal Unionist camp. The election split the Liberal Party in Cardiganshire and the election was hotly contested with almost all the landowners, including those previously regarded as having Liberal sympathies, supporting Davies. He also received the support of several prominent Liberals, especially from his own Methodist denomination. Eventually Davies was defeated by William Bowen Rowlands, the Gladstonian Liberal candidate, by a mere nine votes, a result which was largely attributed to the influence of nonconformist ministers over their congregations. Rowlands served until 1895.

Although he withdrew from political life after his defeat in 1886, Davies became a member of Montgomery County Council in 1889 and was a long-standing member and chairman of the Llandinam School Board. He was also a JP for Montgomeryshire.

== Business ==
=== Early career ===
His first enterprise was the building of a bridge over the Severn at Llandinam. He soon built a reputation as a contractor and was responsible for the building of numerous roads and bridges. From 1855 he was involved in the construction of the Llanidloes and Newtown Railway, which eventually opened in 1859. This line was unusual in that at neither terminus did it connect with any other railway, and the engines and carriages had to be carried on specially constructed wagons from Oswestry, 36 miles away. Together with partners such as Thomas Savin, Davies built the Vale of Clwyd Railway (opened in 1858), the Oswestry and Newtown Railway (1861), the Newtown and Machynlleth Railway (1862) and the Pembroke and Tenby Railway (1863, which was extended to Whitland in 1866). His greatest achievement was the section of the Manchester and Milford Railway from Pencader to Aberystwyth, which opened in 1867. This included the very difficult crossing of Tregaron Bog in the construction of the line between Lampeter and Aberystwyth in 1866. It is reputed that he bought up the entire year's production of sheep fleeces in Ceredigion to lay as a foundation for the railway line on the bog. He later became a director of the Brecon and Merthyr Junction Railway.

=== Industrialist ===
As a result of his success in the railway trade, Davies became a colliery owner. He was an important figure in the industrialisation of the Rhondda Valley, having founded the Parc and Maendy collieries in the 1860s. The Ocean Merthyr company was formed under his chairmanship in 1867 and a number of new collieries were sunk including Dare (1868), Western and Eastern (1872), Garw (1884), and Lady Windsor (1885).

By the 1880s the output from his collieries had increased to such an extent that Davies established a limited liability company, the Ocean Coal Company. At the same time a combination of the inability of the Taff Vale railway and the Bute docks at Cardiff to cope with the Ocean traffic, and the fact that Davies had to pay such high costs to use these facilities, led him Davies to construct new docks at Barry with a railway connection from the Rhondda. The project came to fruition after a lengthy parliamentary process and was completed in 1889. Described by Kenneth Morgan as "the crowning triumph" of David Davies, Barry Docks was successful from the outset. The docks were crucial in the expansion of the South Wales coal trade on a global scale. "The Barry", as the port facility was nicknamed, quickly became Great Britain's most prolific exporter of coal.

Although Davies died the year following the inauguration of the Barry Docks and rail, the facilities had by that time already assisted Ocean Coal to become the most profitable and the largest of South Wales' coal companies.

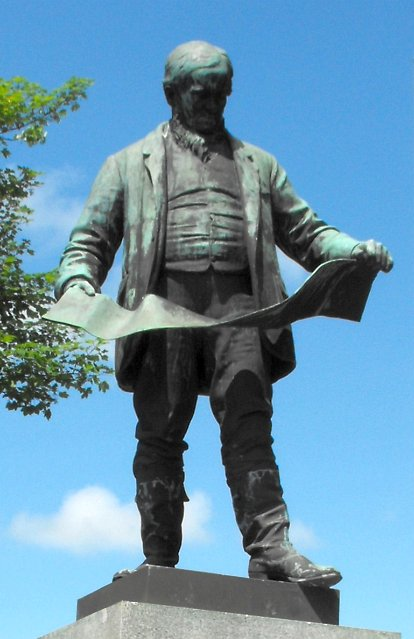
Statue of David Davies, holding the plans for Barry Docks, at Llandinam

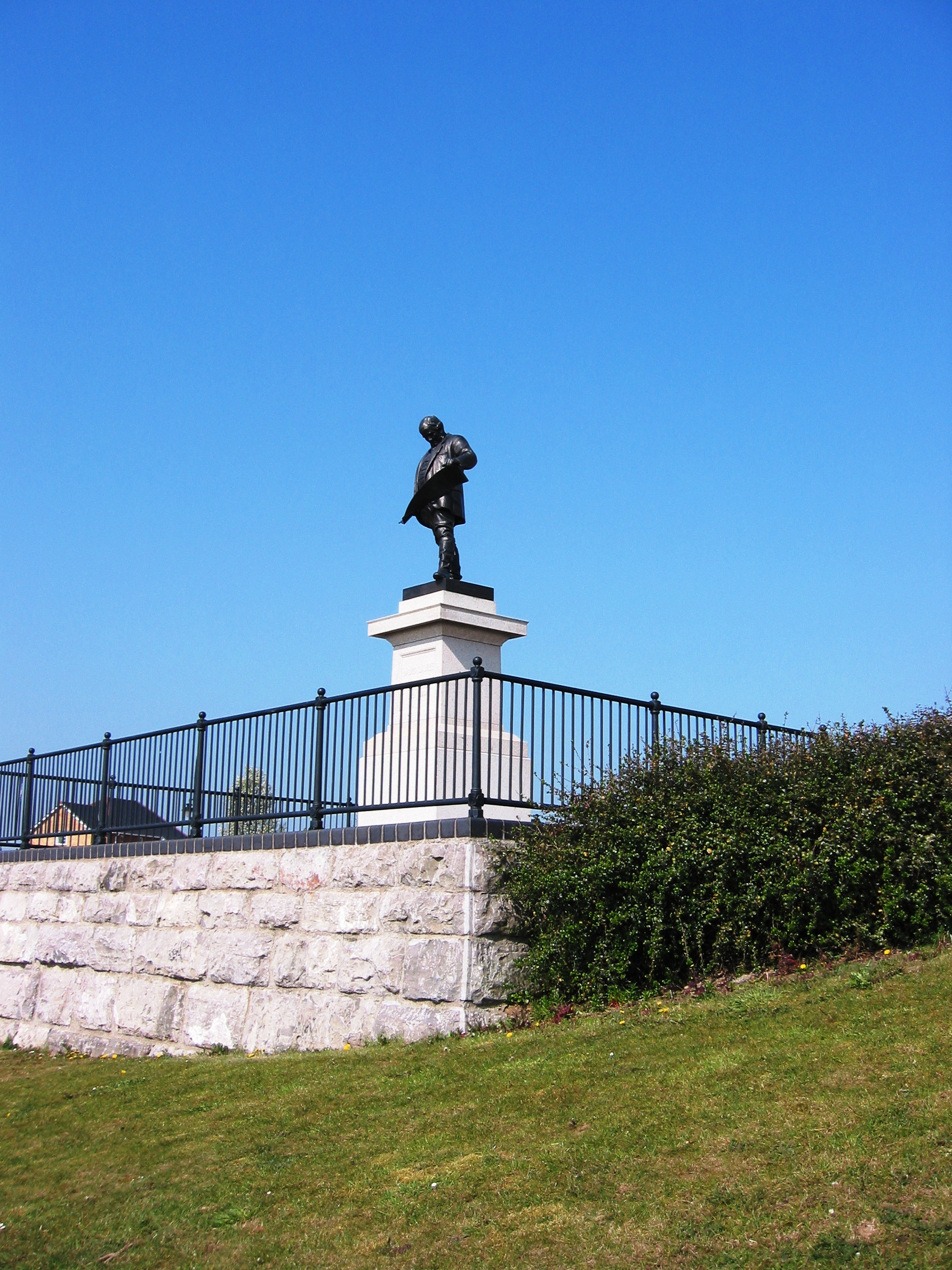
Statue of David Davies outside the Barry Dock Offices, Barry

== Personal life and family ==
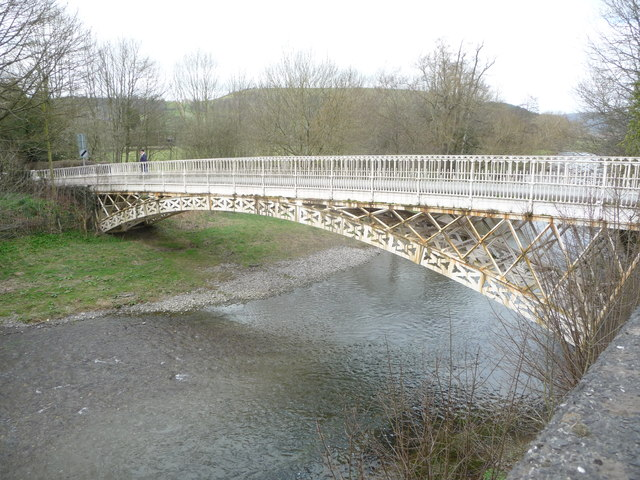
Iron bridge across the River Severn

During his lifetime, he was also known by the nicknames "Top Sawyer" and "Davies the Ocean". His father was a sawyer and lived on the south side of the River Severn in Llandinam so that in winter the house was shaded from the sun because of the enclosing hills. Once he had started to amass his fortune, he built Broneirion, a grand country mansion on the north side of the river that would enjoy sunshine all year round, which has been maintained and operated as a training facility and accommodation by owners Girlguiding Cymru since the 1940s. In 2022, Girlguiding Cymru announced they would be putting the property up for sale.

Davies married Margaret Jones, daughter of Edward Jones of Llanfair in 1851. They had one child, Edward Davies (1852–1898). His grandson, another David Davies, continued Llandinam's philanthropic activities and was elevated to the peerage as 1st Baron Davies. Llandinam's two granddaughters, Gwendoline Davies and Margaret Davies, donated their substantial art collection to the National Museum & Gallery, Cardiff.

Davies was a keen patron and one of the first governors of the Aberystwyth University (then called the University College of Wales) at Aberystwyth and in 1875 was elected treasurer, a post which he held until 1887.

In 1884 he bought the large country house, Plas Dinam, where he died on 20 July 1890, aged 71.

== Sources ==
=== Books and journals ===
- Shore, Leslie M. (2022). The Ocean Coal Company and 'The Barry'. Lightmoor Press. ISBN 978-1915069009.
- Jones, Ieuan Gwynedd (1964). "Cardiganshire Politics in the Mid-Nineteenth Century" (PDF). Ceredigion. 5 (1): 14–41.
- Morgan, Kenneth O. (1960). "Democratic Politics in Glamorgan, 1884–1914" (PDF). Morgannwg. 4: 5–27.
- Morgan, Kenneth O. (1967). "Cardiganshire Politics: The Liberal Ascendancy 1885–1923" (PDF). Ceredigion. 5 (4): 311–346.

=== Online ===
- Bulmer-Thomas, Ivor (1959). "David Davis, Llandinam (1818–1890), industrialist and Member of Parliament". Dictionary of Welsh Biography. National Library of Wales.

Parliament of the United Kingdom
Preceded by Sir Thomas Lloyd, Bt	Member of Parliament for Cardigan Boroughs; 1874 – 1885	Constituency abolished
Preceded by Lewis Pugh Pugh	Member of Parliament for Cardiganshire; 1885 – 1886	Succeeded by William Bowen Rowlands
