= Harford baronets =

Baronetcy in the Baronetage of the United Kingdom

The Harford Baronetcy, of Falcondale in the County of Cardigan, is a title in the Baronetage of the United Kingdom. It was created on 29 June 1934 for Major John Charles Harford.

== Harford baronets, of Falcondale (1934) ==
Escutcheon of the Harford baronets of Falcondale

- Sir John Charles Harford, 1st Baronet (1860–1934)
- Sir George Arthur Harford, 2nd Baronet (1897–1967)
- Sir (John) Timothy Harford, 3rd Baronet (1932–2010)
- Sir Mark John Harford, 4th Baronet (born 1964)

The heir presumptive is the present holder's brother Simon Guy Harford (born 1966).
