= Gogerddan =

Mansion house in Wales

Coordinates: 52°26′1″N 4°1′1″W

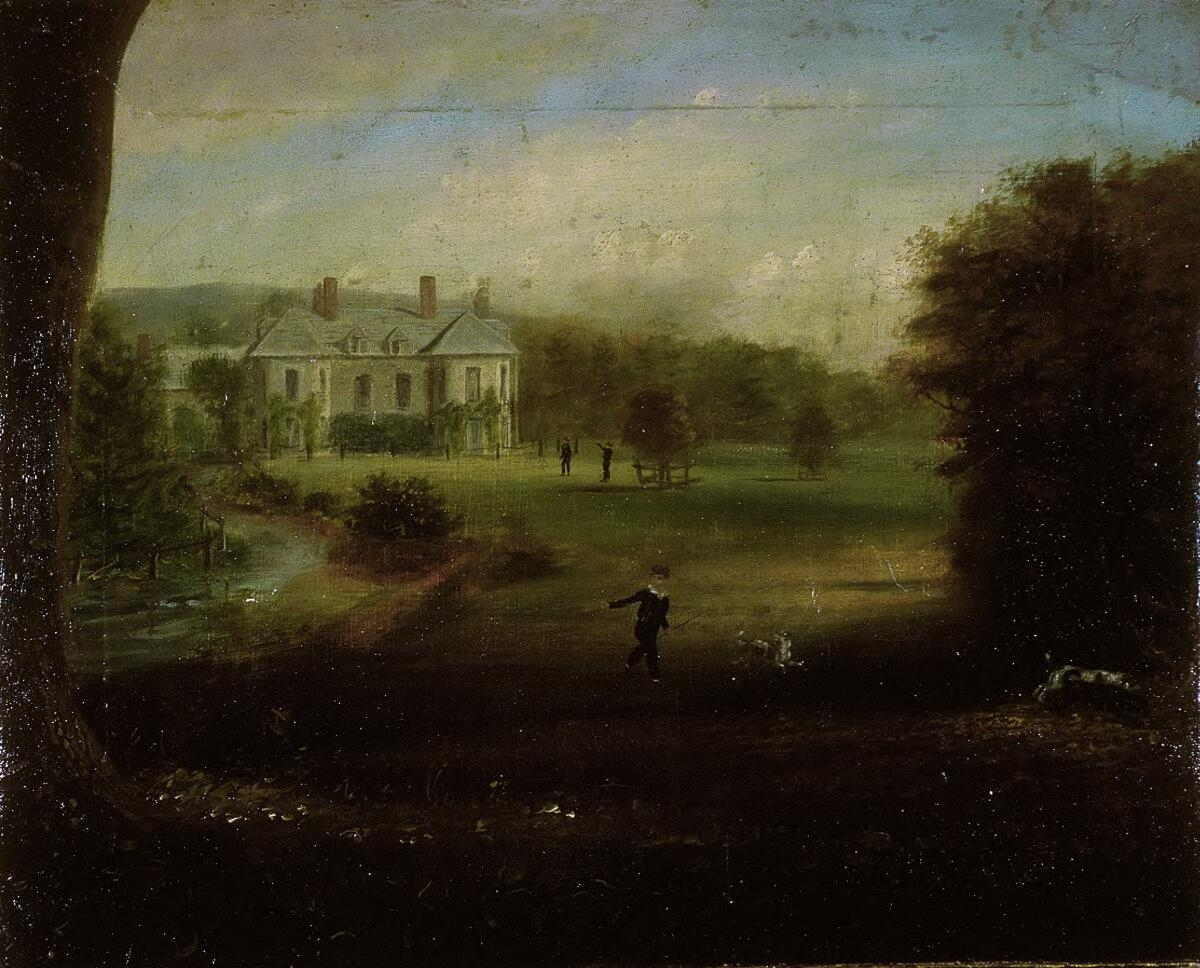
Plas Gogerddan, ca 1800 – artist unknown

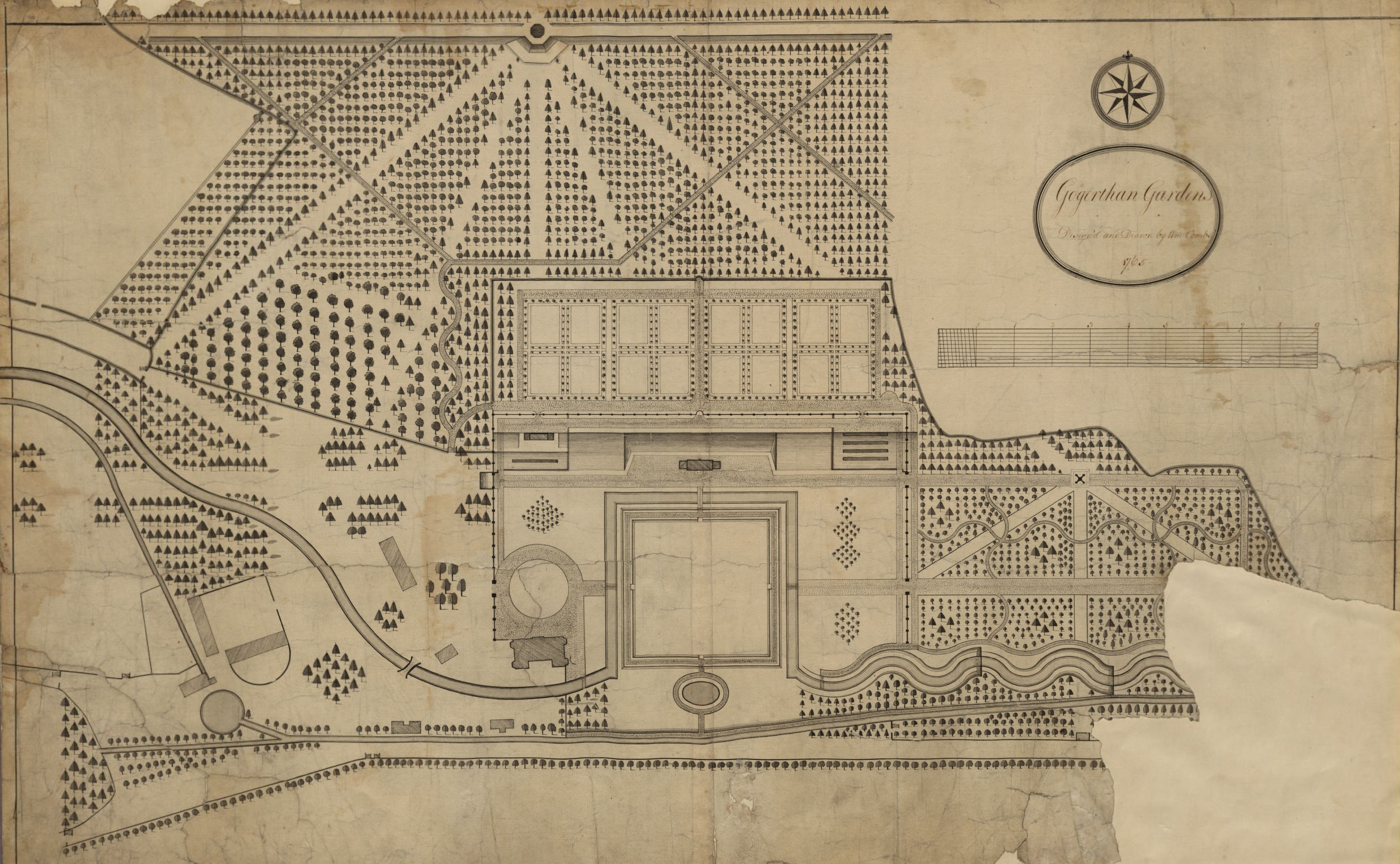
Plan of the gardens at Gogerddan, 1765

Gogerddan (also spelled Gogarthen) was an estate near to Trefeurig and the most important in what was then the county of Cardiganshire, Wales. Owned since at least the fifteenth century by the Pryse family, the main house, called Plas Gogerddan, still stands and is a Grade II listed building. The estate became especially wealthy from the seventeenth century on the profits from lead mining, which is when the house was constructed. The house was significantly altered in the 1860s and was sold by Sir Pryse Loveden Saunders-Pryse to University College of Wales in 1949.

Gogerddan provisionally held the high temperature record for Wales – 35.3°C, which was recorded on 18 July 2022. It replaced the previous record holder Hawarden which held the record for almost 32 years. This record was short-lived, however, as by the end of the same day, Hawarden recorded a temperature of 37.1°C.

== See also ==
- Pryse baronets
