= United Kingdom general election results in Mid and West Wales =

Mid and West Wales region used by the Senedd (in Wales)

These are the election results from United Kingdom general elections based on the electoral regional boundaries used by the Senedd (Welsh Parliament), for the Senedd electoral region of Mid and West Wales. Since the 1997 general election, this grouping of constituencies into this unofficial region have elected eight Members of Parliament to the House of Commons of the United Kingdom.

== Regional profile ==
The boundaries are based on the Senedd electoral region Mid and West Wales. Regions are not used in UK general elections.

== Representation over time ==
=== 1997-2024 ===
Year/Seat	Brecon and Radnorshire	Carmarthen East and Dinefwr	Carmarthen West and South Pembrokeshire	Ceredigion	Llanelli	Meirionnydd Nant Conwy /Dwyfor Meirionnydd	Montgomeryshire	Preseli Pembrokeshire
1997	Richard Livsey	Alan Williams	Nick Ainger	Cynog Dafis	Denzil Davies	Elfyn Llwyd	Lembit Öpik	Jackie Lawrence
2000 by-election	Richard Livsey	Alan Williams	Nick Ainger	Simon Thomas	Denzil Davies	Elfyn Llwyd	Lembit Öpik	Jackie Lawrence
2001	Roger Williams	Adam Price	Nick Ainger	Simon Thomas	Denzil Davies	Elfyn Llwyd	Lembit Öpik	Jackie Lawrence
2005	Roger Williams	Adam Price	Nick Ainger	Mark Williams	Nia Griffith	Elfyn Llwyd	Lembit Öpik	Stephen Crabb
2010	Roger Williams	Jonathan Edwards	Simon Hart	Mark Williams	Nia Griffith	Liz Saville Roberts	Glyn Davies	Stephen Crabb
2015	Christopher Davies	Jonathan Edwards	Simon Hart	Mark Williams	Nia Griffith	Liz Saville Roberts	Glyn Davies	Stephen Crabb
2017	Christopher Davies	Jonathan Edwards	Simon Hart	Ben Lake	Nia Griffith	Liz Saville Roberts	Glyn Davies	Stephen Crabb
2019 by-election	Jane Dodds	Jonathan Edwards	Simon Hart	Ben Lake	Nia Griffith	Liz Saville Roberts	Glyn Davies	Stephen Crabb
2019	Fay Jones	Jonathan Edwards	Simon Hart	Ben Lake	Nia Griffith	Liz Saville Roberts	Craig Williams	Stephen Crabb

=== Since 2024 ===
Year/Seat	Brecon, Radnor and Cwm Tawe	Caerfyrddin	Ceredigion Preseli	Dwyfor Meirionnydd	Llanelli	Mid and South Pembrokeshire	Montgomeryshire and Glyndŵr
2024	David Chadwick	Ann Davies	Ben Lake	Liz Saville Roberts	Nia Griffith	Henry Tufnell	Steve Witherden

== 2005 ==
Constituency	Candidates					Incumbent
Constituency	Labour	Conservative	Liberal Democrat	Plaid Cymru	Other	Incumbent
Brecon and Radnorshire	Leighton Veale 5,755 (15.0%)	Andrew RT Davies 13,277 (34.6%)	Roger Williams 17,182 (44.8%)	Mabon ap Gwynfor 1,404 (3.7%)	Elizabeth Phillips (UKIP) 723 (1.9%)	Roger Williams
Carmarthen East and Dinefwr	Ross Hendry 10,843 (28.3%)	Suzy Davies 5,235 (13.7%)	Juliana Hughes 3,719 (9.7%)	Adam Price 17,561 (45.9%)	Mike Squires (UKIP) 661 (1.7%) Sid Whitworth (Legalise Cannabis) 272 (0.7%)	Adam Price
Carmarthen West and South Pembrokeshire	Nick Ainger 13,953 (36.9%)	David Morris 12,043 (31.8%)	John Allen 5,399 (14.3%)	John Dixon 5,582 (14.7%)	Josie MacDonald (UKIP) 545 (1.4%) Alexander Daszak (Legalise Cannabis) 237 (0.6%) Nick Turner (Independent) 104 (0.3%)	Nick Ainger
Ceredigion	Alun Davies 4,337 (12.1%)	John Harrison 4,455 (12.4%)	Mark Williams 13,130 (36.5%)	Simon Thomas 12,911 (35.9%)	Dave Bradney (Green) 846 (2.3%) Iain Sheldon (Veritas) 268 (0.7%)	Simon Thomas
Llanelli	Nia Griffith 16,592 (46.9%)	Adrian Phillips 4,844 (13.7%)	Ken Rees 4,550 (12.9%)	Neil Baker 9,358 (26.5%)	Jan Cliff (Green) 515 (1.4%) John Willock (SLP) 407 (1.2%)	Denzil Davies
Meirionnydd Nant Conwy	Rhodri Jones 3,983 (19.3%)	Dan Munford 3,402 (16.5%)	Adrian Fawcett 2,192 (10.6%)	Elfyn Llwyd 10,597 (51.3%)	Francis Wykes (UKIP) 466 (2.3%)	Elfyn Llwyd
Montgomeryshire	David Tinline 3,454 (11.5%)	Simon Baynes 8,246 (27.4%)	Lembit Öpik 15,419 (51.2%)	Ellen ap Gwynn 2,078 (6.9%)	Clive Easton (UKIP) 900 (3.0%)	Lembit Öpik
Preseli Pembrokeshire	Sue Hayman 13,499 (35.0%)	Stephen Crabb 14,106 (36.3%)	Dewi Smith 4,963 (12.9%)	Matt Mathias 4,752 (12.3%)	James Carver (UKIP) 498 (1.3%) Molly Scott Cato (Green) 494 (1.3%) Patricia Bowen (SLP) 275 (0.7%)	Jackie Lawrence

== 2001 ==
Mid and West Wales elected eight Members of Parliament.

Constituency	Candidates					Incumbent
Constituency	Labour	Conservative	Liberal Democrat	Plaid Cymru	Other	Incumbent
Brecon and Radnorshire	Huw Irranca-Davies 8,024 (21.4%)	Felix Aubel 13,073 (34.8%)	Roger Williams 13,824 (36.8%)	Brynach Parri 1,301 (3.5%)	Ian Mitchell (Ind.) 762 (2.0%) Elizabeth Phillips (UKIP) 452 (1.2%) Robert Nicholson (Ind.) 80 (0.2%)	Richard Livsey
Carmarthen East and Dinefwr	Alan Williams 13,540 (35.6%)	David Thomas 4,912 (35.6%)	Doiran Evans 2,815 (7.4%)	Adam Price 16,130 (42.4%)	Michael Squires (UKIP) 656 (1.7%)	Alan Williams
Carmarthen West and South Pembrokeshire	Nick Ainger 15,349 (41.6%)	Robert Wilson 10,811 (29.3%)	William Jeremy 3,248 (8.8%)	Llyr Gruffydd 6,893 (18.7%)	Ian Phillips (UKIP) 537 (1.5%) Nicholas Turner (Direct Customer Service Party) 78 (0.2%)	Nick Ainger
Ceredigion	David Grace 5,338 (15.4%)	Paul Davies 6,730 (19.4%)	Mark Williams 9,297 (26.9%)	Simon Thomas 13,241 (38.3%)		Simon Thomas
Llanelli	Denzil Davies 17,586 (48.6%)	Simon Hayes 3,442 (9.5%)	Ken Rees 3,065 (8.5%)	Dyfan Jones 11,183 (30.9%)	Jan Cliff (Green) 515 (1.4%) John Willock (SLP) 407 (1.2%)	Denzil Davies
Meirionnydd Nant Conwy	Denise Idris Jones 4,775 (22.7%)	Lisa Francis 3,962 (18.8%)	Dafydd Raw-Rees 1,872 (8.9%)	Elfyn Llwyd 10,459 (49.6%)		Elfyn Llwyd
Montgomeryshire	Paul Davies 3,443 (11.9%)	David Jones 8,085 (27.9%)	Lembit Öpik 14,319 (49.4%)	David Senior 1,969 (6.8%)	David Rowlands (UKIP) 786 (2.7%) Ruth Davies (ProLife Alliance) 210 (0.7%) Reginald Taylor (Ind.) 171 (0.6%)	Lembit Öpik
Preseli Pembrokeshire	Jackie Lawrence 15,206 (41.3%)	Stephen Crabb 12,260 (33.3%)	Alexander Dauncey 3,882 (10.6%)	Rhys Sinnett 4,658 (12.7%)	Patricia Bowen (SLP) 452 (1.2%) Hugh Jones (UKIP) 319 (0.9%)	Jackie Lawrence

Map of current boundaries

== 1997 ==
Mid and West Wales elected eight Members of Parliament.

Constituency	Candidates						Incumbent
Constituency	Labour	Conservative	Liberal Democrat	Plaid Cymru	Referendum	Other	Incumbent
Brecon and Radnorshire	Christopher Mann 11,424 (26.6%)	Jonathan Evans 12,419 (29.0%)	Richard Livsey 17,516 (40.8%)	Steven Cornelius 622 (1.5%)	Elizabeth Phillips 900 (2.1%)		Bill Walker
Carmarthen East and Dinefwr	Alan Williams 17,907 (42.9%)	Edmund Hayward 5,022 (12.0%)	Juliana Hughes 3,150 (7.5%)	Rhodri Glyn Thomas 14,457 (34.6%)	Ian Humphreys-Evans 1,196 (2.9%)		Alan Williams‡ (Carmarthen)
Carmarthen West and South Pembrokeshire	Nick Ainger 20,956 (49.1%)	Owen Williams 11,335 (26.6%)	Keith Evans 3,516 (8.2%)	Roy Llewellyn 5,402 (12.7%)	Joy Poirrier 1,432 (3.4%)		Nick Ainger‡ (Pembrokeshire)
Ceredigion	Robert (Hag) Harris 9,767 (24.3%)	Felix Aubel 5,983 (14.9%)	Dai Davies 6,616 (16.5%)	Cynog Dafis 16,728 (41.6%)	John Leaney 1,092 (2.7%)		Cynog Dafis‡ (Ceredigion and Pembroke North)
Llanelli	Denzil Davies 28,851 (57.9%)	Andrew Hayes 5,003 (12.1%)	Nick Burree 3,788 (9.2%)	Marc Phillips 7,812 (19.0%)		John Willock (SLP) 757 (1.8%)	Denzil Davies
Meirionnydd Nant Conwy	Hefin E. Rees 5,660 (23.0%)	Jeremy Quin 3,922 (16.0%)	Robina L. Feeley 1,719 (7.0%)	Elfyn Llwyd 12,465 (50.7%)	Phillip H. Hodge 809 (3.3%)		Elfyn Llwyd
Montgomeryshire	Angharad Davies 6,109 (19.1%)	Glyn Davies 8,344 (26.1%)	Lembit Öpik 14,647 (45.9%)	Helen Mary Jones 1,608 (5.0%)	John Bufton 879 (2.8%)	Susan Walker (Green) 338 (1.1%)	Alex Carlile†
Preseli Pembrokeshire	Jackie Lawrence 20,477 (48.3%)	Robert Buckland 11,741 (27.7%)	Jeffrey Clarke 5,527 (13.0%)	Alun Jones 2,683 (6.3%)	David Berry 1,574 (3.7%)	Molly Scott Cato (Green) 401 (0.9%)	Nick Ainger‡ (Pembrokeshire)
