= List of Plaid Cymru MPs =

This is a list of Plaid Cymru MPs. It includes all members of Parliament elected to the British House of Commons representing Plaid Cymru. Members of the Senedd or the European Parliament are not listed.

Name	Constituency	Served from	Served to	Term length	Days
Dafydd Wigley	Caernarfon	28 February 1974	7 June 2001	27 years, 99 days	9,961
Hywel Williams	Caernarfon then Arfon	8 June 2001	30 May 2024	22 years, 357 days	8,392
Elfyn Llwyd	Meirionnydd Nant Conwy then Dwyfor Meirionnydd	9 April 1992	30 March 2015	22 years, 355 days	8,390
Dafydd Elis-Thomas	Meirionnydd then Meirionnydd Nant Conwy	28 February 1974	9 April 1992	18 years, 41 days	6,615
Ieuan Wyn Jones	Ynys Môn	11 June 1987	7 June 2001	13 years, 361 days	5,110
Liz Saville Roberts	Dwyfor Meirionnydd	8 May 2015	present	10 years, 299 days	3,952
Jonathan Edwards	Carmarthen East and Dinefwr	6 May 2010	22 May 2020 (Note: Whip suspended. Edwards rejoined on 10 August 2022 and left again on 13 August 2022)	10 years, 16 days	3,669
Adam Price	Carmarthen East and Dinefwr	8 June 2001	12 April 2010	8 years, 308 days	3,230
Gwynfor Evans	Carmarthen	14 July 1966	18 June 1970	8 years 5 months 27 days	3,101
Gwynfor Evans	Carmarthen	10 October 1974	3 May 1979	8 years 5 months 27 days	3,101
Ben Lake	Ceredigion	9 June 2017	present	8 years, 267 days	3,189
Cynog Dafis	Ceredigion and Pembroke North then Ceredigion	9 April 1992	8 January 2000	7 years, 274 days	2,830
Simon Thomas	Ceredigion	3 February 2000	5 May 2005	5 years, 91 days	1,918
Ann Davies	Caerfyrddin	4 July 2024	present	1 year, 242 days	607
Llinos Medi	Ynys Môn	4 July 2024	present	1 year, 242 days	607

Dates are taken from a House of Commons Library Briefing. Following a rule change that came into force at the 2005 general election MPs who were defeated (eg Simon Thomas) are shown as serving up to and including the day of the election at which they were defeated. MPs who voluntarily stood down (eg Elfyn Llwyd) are shown as serving up until the day of dissolution of their final Parliament.

== Tabular representation ==
Constituency	1966	1970	Feb 74	Oct 74	1979	1987	1992	1997	2000	2001	2005	2010	2015	2017	2019	2020	2024
Carmarthen / Carmarthen East and Dinefwr / Caerfyrddin	Evans			Evans						Price		Edwards					Davies
Caernarfon / Arfon			Wigley							Williams							
Merionethshire / Meirionnydd Nant Conwy (1983-2010) / Dwyfor Meirionnydd			Elis-Thomas				Llwyd						Saville Roberts				
Ynys Môn						Wyn Jones											Medi
Ceredigion & Pembroke North / Ceredigion / Ceredigion Preseli							Dafis		Thomas					Lake			
No. of Plaid Cymru MPs	1	0	2	3	2	3	4	4	4	4	3	3	3	4	4	3	4

== See also ==
- List of Plaid Cymru MSs
