= 1961 Cardiganshire County Council election =

1961 Welsh local government election

The twenty-second election to Cardiganshire County Council took place in April 1961. It was preceded by the 1958 election and followed by the 1964 election.

== Candidates ==
46 candidates were returned unopposed resulting in only four contests, a record low.

== Outcome ==
The only surprise in the four contests was at Llandysul, where retiring member Edward Lewis, owner of the Gomer Press, was defeated after eighteen years.

== Results ==
=== Aberaeron ===
Aberaeron 1961
Party	Candidate	Votes	%	±%
Independent	Evan John Thomas*	Unopposed		
Independent	Phyllis Warden Sewell	163		
Majority		418		
Independent hold		Swing		

=== Aberbanc ===
Aberbanc 1961
Party	Candidate	Votes	%	±%
Independent	Dr Stanley George Budd*	Unopposed		
Independent hold		Swing		

=== Aberporth ===
Aberporth 1961
Party	Candidate	Votes	%	±%
Independent	David M.H. Williams*	Unopposed		
Independent hold		Swing		

=== Aberystwyth Division 1 ===
Aberystwyth Division 1 1961
Party	Candidate	Votes	%	±%
Labour	John John+	Unopposed		
Labour hold		Swing		

=== Aberystwyth Division 2 ===
Aberystwyth Division 2 1961
Party	Candidate	Votes	%	±%
Independent	Mrs T.M. Hoskins*	Unopposed		
Independent hold		Swing		

=== Aberystwyth Division 3 ===
Aberystwyth Division 3 1961
Party	Candidate	Votes	%	±%
Independent	Ryland Kenneth Clues*	386		
Independent hold		Swing		

=== Aberystwyth Division 4 ===
Aberystwyth Division 4 1961
Party	Candidate	Votes	%	±%
Independent	Richard Rowlands*	Unopposed		
Independent hold		Swing		

=== Aberystwyth Division 5 ===
Aberystwyth Division 5 1961
Party	Candidate	Votes	%	±%
Independent	Richard Jenkin Ellis*	Unopposed		
Independent hold		Swing		

=== Aberystwyth Division 6 ===
Aberystwyth Division 6 1961
Party	Candidate	Votes	%	±%
Independent	Gwendolen Eluned Jones*	Unopposed		
Independent hold		Swing		

=== Aeron ===
Aeron 1961
Party	Candidate	Votes	%	±%
Independent	Evan Glyn Davies+	405		
Independent	Evan Hughes*	249		
Majority		156		
Independent gain from Independent		Swing		

=== Borth ===
Borth 1961
Party	Candidate	Votes	%	±%
Independent	W. Jones Morris	Unopposed		
Independent hold		Swing		

=== Bow Street ===
Bow Street 1961
Party	Candidate	Votes	%	±%
Independent	Bodin Trevor Williams*	Unopposed		
Independent hold		Swing		

=== Cardigan North ===
Cardigan North 1961
Party	Candidate	Votes	%	±%
Independent	Arthur Thomas*	Unopposed		
Independent hold		Swing		

=== Cardigan South ===
Cardigan South 1961
Party	Candidate	Votes	%	±%
Independent	Benjamin Lewis	Unopposed		
Independent hold		Swing		

=== Cilcennin ===
Cilcennin 1961
Party	Candidate	Votes	%	±%
Independent	L.E. Jones	298		
Independent	William Jenkin Jones*	238		
Majority		60		
Independent gain from Independent		Swing		

=== Cwmrheidol ===
Cwmrheidol 1961
Party	Candidate	Votes	%	±%
Independent	Geraint Wyn Howells*	Unopposed		
Independent hold		Swing		

=== Devil's Bridge ===
Devil's Bridge 1961
Party	Candidate	Votes	%	±%
Independent	Ivor Charles Williams	Unopposed		
Independent hold		Swing		

=== Felinfach ===
Felinfach 1961
Party	Candidate	Votes	%	±%
Independent	Thomas Davies*	Unopposed		
Independent hold		Swing		

=== Goginan ===
Goginan 1961
Party	Candidate	Votes	%	±%
Independent	Isaac Richard Lewis*	Unopposed		
Independent hold		Swing		

=== Lampeter Borough ===
Lampeter Borough 1961
Party	Candidate	Votes	%	±%
Independent	Rev T. Oswald Williams*	Unopposed		
Independent hold		Swing		

=== Llanarth ===
Llanarth 1961
Party	Candidate	Votes	%	±%
Independent	Rev. Edwin Pryce Jones*	Unopposed		
Independent hold		Swing		

=== Llanbadarn Fawr ===
Llanbadarn Fawr 1961
Party	Candidate	Votes	%	±%
Independent	Percy Ewart Davies	Unopposed		
Independent hold		Swing		

=== Llanddewi Brefi ===
Llanddewi Brefi 1961
Party	Candidate	Votes	%	±%
Independent	William Morgan Davies*	Unopposed		
Independent hold		Swing		

=== Llandygwydd ===
Llandygwydd 1961
Party	Candidate	Votes	%	±%
Independent	Melbourne Evan Griffiths*	Unopposed		
Independent hold		Swing		

=== Llandysul North ===
Llandysul North 1961
Party	Candidate	Votes	%	±%
Independent	Griffith Davies*	Unopposed		
Independent hold		Swing		

=== Llandysul South ===
Llandysul South 1961
Party	Candidate	Votes	%	±%
Independent	John Leighton Davies	485		
Independent	Edward Lewis*	456		
Majority		29		
Independent gain from Independent		Swing		

=== Llansysiliogogo ===
Llandysiliogogo 1961
Party	Candidate	Votes	%	±%
Independent	Ben Thomas*	Unopposed		
Independent hold		Swing		

=== Llanfair Clydogau ===
Llanfair Clydogau 1961
Party	Candidate	Votes	%	±%
Independent	Daniel Owen Morgan*	Unopposed		
Independent hold		Swing		

=== Llanfarian ===
Llanfarian 1961
Party	Candidate	Votes	%	±%
Independent	William Zadrach Jones+	Unopposed		
Independent hold		Swing		

=== Llanfihangel y Creuddyn ===
Llanfihangel y Creuddyn 1961
Party	Candidate	Votes	%	±%
Independent	David Howell Jones*	Unopposed		
Independent hold		Swing		

=== Llangoedmor ===
Llangoedmor 1961
Party	Candidate	Votes	%	±%
Independent	Evan Davies*	Unopposed		
Independent hold		Swing		

=== Llangeitho ===
Llangeitho 1961
Party	Candidate	Votes	%	±%
Independent	David Lloyd*	Unopposed		
Independent hold		Swing		

=== Llangrannog ===
Llangrannog 1961
Party	Candidate	Votes	%	±%
Independent	Benjamin Griffiths*	Unopposed		
Independent hold		Swing		

=== Llanilar ===
Llanilar 1961
Party	Candidate	Votes	%	±%
Independent	David Charles Morgan*	Unopposed		
Independent hold		Swing		

=== Llanrhystyd ===
Llanrhystyd 1961
Party	Candidate	Votes	%	±%
Independent	Idwal James*	Unopposed		
Independent hold		Swing		

=== Llanllwchaiarn ===
Llanllwchaiarn 1961
Party	Candidate	Votes	%	±%
Independent	Rev Thomas Pugh Jarman*	Unopposed		
Independent hold		Swing		

=== Llansantffraed ===
Llansantffraed 1961
Party	Candidate	Votes	%	±%
Independent	G.T. Davies*	354		
Independent hold		Swing		

=== Llanwnen ===
Llanwnen 1961
Party	Candidate	Votes	%	±%
Independent	William Grey Hughes*	Unopposed		
Independent hold		Swing		

=== Llanwenog ===
Llanwenog 1961
Party	Candidate	Votes	%	±%
Independent	Thomas Donald Gwarnant Williams*	Unopposed		
Independent hold		Swing		

=== Lledrod ===
Lledrod 1961
Party	Candidate	Votes	%	±%
Independent	John David Herbert*	Unopposed		
Independent hold		Swing		

=== Nantcwnlle ===
Nantcwnlle 1961
Party	Candidate	Votes	%	±%
Independent	R.O. Williams*	Unopposed		
Independent hold		Swing		

=== New Quay ===
New Quay 1961
Party	Candidate	Votes	%	±%
Independent	John Owen Williams*	Unopposed		

=== Penbryn ===
Penbryn 1961
Party	Candidate	Votes	%	±%
Independent	Morgan Lloyd Jenkins*	Unopposed		
Independent hold		Swing		

=== Strata Florida ===
Strata Florida 1961
Party	Candidate	Votes	%	±%
Independent	W.H.R. Llewellyn	Unopposed		
Independent hold		Swing		

=== Taliesin ===
Taliesin 1961
Party	Candidate	Votes	%	±%
Independent	Gwilym Caradog Jones*	Unopposed		
Independent hold		Swing		

=== Talybont ===
Talybont 1961
Party	Candidate	Votes	%	±%
Independent	Isaac Richard Jenkins*	Unopposed		
Independent hold		Swing		

=== Trefeurig ===
Trefeurig 1961
Party	Candidate	Votes	%	±%
Independent	Jenkin Davies*	Unopposed		
Independent hold		Swing		

=== Tregaron ===
Tregaron 1961
Party	Candidate	Votes	%	±%
Independent	John Lewis	417		
Independent	Windsor Jenkins	273		
Majority		144		
Independent hold		Swing		

=== Troedyraur ===
Troedyraur 1961
Party	Candidate	Votes	%	±%
Independent	Hywel Heulyn Roberts*	Unopposed		
Independent hold		Swing		

=== Ysbyty Ystwyth ===
Ysbyty Ystwyth 1961
Party	Candidate	Votes	%	±%
Independent	Thomas Caradog Edwards*	188		
Independent	John Jones	157		
Majority		31		
Independent hold		Swing		

== Election of Aldermen ==
In addition to the 50 councillors the council consisted of 16 county aldermen. Aldermen were elected by the council, and served a six-year term. Following the 1961election, there were eight aldermanic vacancies which were filled at the annual meeting.

The following retiring aldermen were re-elected:

- Evan Davies, Llechryd
- W.Z. Jones, Llanfarian
- Meredydd Ll.G. Williams, Llanwenog

In addition, the following four new aldermen were elected:

- Mrs G.E. Jones, Aberystwyth
- D.H. Jones, Capel Seion
- E.J. Thomas, Aberaeron
- W. Morgan Davies, Llanddewi Brefi
- Morgan Lloyd Jenkins, Brynhoffnant

John John, Aberystwyth, the sole Labour member of the authority, and Evan Glyn Davies, Aberarth, were not re-elected aldermen.

== By-elections ==
Six by-elections were called following the election of aldermen. Five of the wards were contested in elections held on 3 June. At Llanfarian, the former councillor who had stood down in favour of Alderman W.Z. Jones was returned unopposed. There were no vacancies in the other two wards due to the incumbents being life aldermen.

=== Aberaeron by-election ===
Aberaeron by-election 1961
Party	Candidate	Votes	%	±%
Independent	Thomas Glyn Griffiths Herbert	537		
Independent	John Jordan Jones	198		
Independent	Phyllis W. Sewell	67		
Majority		339		
Independent hold		Swing		

=== Aberystwyth Division 6 by-election ===
Aberystwyth Division 6 by-election 1961
Party	Candidate	Votes	%	±%
Independent	Griffith Davies	357		
Independent	Graham B.J. Hughes	198		
Majority		159		
Independent hold		Swing		

=== Llanddewi Brefi by-election ===
Llanddewi Brefi by-election 1961
Party	Candidate	Votes	%	±%
Independent	Charles Emlyn Jones	226		
Independent	Edward Jenkin Davies	185		
Independent	Daniel James Jones	32		
Majority		41		
Independent hold		Swing		

=== Llanfarian by-election ===
Llanfarian by-election 1961
Party	Candidate	Votes	%	±%
Independent	J.D.H. Matthews*	Unopposed		
Independent hold		Swing		

=== Llanfihangel-y-Creuddyn by-election ===
Llanfihangel-y-Creuddyn by-election 1961
Party	Candidate	Votes	%	±%
Independent	Rev John Harold Rees	319		
Independent	Richard Evan Richards	204		
Majority		115		
Independent hold		Swing		

=== Penbryn by-election ===
Penbryn by-election 1961
Party	Candidate	Votes	%	±%
Independent	John Owen James Davies	437		
Independent	Nellie Eirwen Evans	158		
Majority		279		
Independent hold		Swing		
