= 1958 Cardiganshire County Council election =

1958 Welsh local government election

The twenty-first election to Cardiganshire County Council took place in April 1958. It was preceded by the 1955 election and followed by the 1961 election.

== Candidates ==
41 candidates were returned unopposed resulting in only nine contests.

Eight aldermen retired, of whom four sought election. Retiring councillors stood down in favour of aldermen in Aberystwyth, Llanllwchaiarn and at Bow Street, where D.R. Morgan, first elected in 1922, was again returned. At Aberporth, however, retiring alderman the Rev. Evan Melinfab Lewis was opposed by the retiring councillor, the Rev. Tegryn Davies.

== Outcome ==
With only nine contests, attention focused entirely on the contest at Aberporth between the retiring alderman and councillor, both of whom were nonconformist ministers. Evan Melinfab Lewis, Baptist minister at Penparc, was a previous chairman of the council and a member since 1937, while Tegryn Davies was the Congregational minister at Aberporth. Denominationlism featured prominently in the contest and on a turnout of 88%, Davies was returned. It was reported that the crowd that gathered at Aberporth to hear the result was among the largest ever seen at a Cardiganshire local authority election. Two other sitting members were also defeated.

== Results ==
=== Aberaeron ===
Aberaeron 1958
Party	Candidate	Votes	%	±%
Independent	Evan John Thomas*	Unopposed		
Independent hold		Swing		

=== Aberbanc ===
Aberbanc 1958
Party	Candidate	Votes	%	±%
Independent	Dr Stanley George Budd*	Unopposed		
Independent hold		Swing		

=== Aberporth ===
Aberporth 1958
Party	Candidate	Votes	%	±%
Independent	Rev Tegryn Davies*	668		
Independent	Rev Evan Melinfab Lewis+	477		
Majority		191		
Independent hold		Swing		

=== Aberystwyth Division 1 ===
Aberystwyth Division 1 1958
Party	Candidate	Votes	%	±%
Labour	J. Caleb Edwards	422		
Independent	William Williams	317		
Majority		105		
Labour hold		Swing		

=== Aberystwyth Division 2 ===
Aberystwyth Division 2 1958
Party	Candidate	Votes	%	±%
Independent	Gwendoline Calan Evans+	Unopposed		
Independent hold		Swing		

=== Aberystwyth Division 3 ===
Aberystwyth Division 3 1958
Party	Candidate	Votes	%	±%
Independent	Ryland Kenneth Clues*	386		
Independent hold		Swing		

=== Aberystwyth Division 4 ===
Aberystwyth Division 4 1958
Party	Candidate	Votes	%	±%
Independent	Richard Rowlands	Unopposed		
Independent hold		Swing		

=== Aberystwyth Division 5 ===
Aberystwyth Division 5 1958
Party	Candidate	Votes	%	±%
Independent	Richard Jenkin Ellis*	Unopposed		
Independent hold		Swing		

=== Aberystwyth Division 6 ===
Aberystwyth Division 6 1958
Party	Candidate	Votes	%	±%
Independent	Gwendolen Eluned Jones*	Unopposed		
Independent hold		Swing		

=== Aeron ===
Aeron 1958
Party	Candidate	Votes	%	±%
Independent	Evan Hughes*	Unopposed		
Independent	Lewis Phillips	223		
Majority		112		
Independent hold		Swing		

=== Borth ===
Borth 1958
Party	Candidate	Votes	%	±%
Independent	W. Jones Morris	Unopposed		
Independent hold		Swing		

=== Bow Street ===
Bow Street 1958
Party	Candidate	Votes	%	±%
Independent	David Rees Morgan+	Unopposed		
Independent hold		Swing		

=== Cardigan North ===
Cardigan North 1958
Party	Candidate	Votes	%	±%
Independent	Arthur Thomas*	Unopposed		
Independent hold		Swing		

=== Cardigan South ===
Cardigan South 1958
Party	Candidate	Votes	%	±%
Independent	Albert Hallam*	Unopposed		
Independent hold		Swing		

=== Cilcennin ===
Cilcennin 1958
Party	Candidate	Votes	%	±%
Independent	L.E. Jones	298		
Independent	William Jenkin Jones*	238		
Majority		60		
Independent gain from Independent		Swing		

=== Cwmrheidol ===
Cwmrheidol 1958
Party	Candidate	Votes	%	±%
Independent	Geraint Wyn Howells*	Unopposed		
Independent hold		Swing		

=== Devil's Bridge ===
Devil's Bridge 1958
Party	Candidate	Votes	%	±%
Independent	Ivor Charles Williams	Unopposed		
Independent hold		Swing		

=== Felinfach ===
Felinfach 1958
Party	Candidate	Votes	%	±%
Independent	Thomas Davies*	Unopposed		
Independent hold		Swing		

=== Goginan ===
Goginan 1958
Party	Candidate	Votes	%	±%
Independent	Isaac Richard Lewis*	Unopposed		
Independent hold		Swing		

=== Lampeter Borough ===
Lampeter Borough 1958
Party	Candidate	Votes	%	±%
Independent	Rev T. Oswald Williams*	Unopposed		
Independent hold		Swing		

=== Llanarth ===
Llanarth 1958
Party	Candidate	Votes	%	±%
Independent	Rev. Edwin Pryce Jones*	Unopposed		
Independent hold		Swing		

=== Llanbadarn Fawr ===
Llanbadarn Fawr 1958
Party	Candidate	Votes	%	±%
Independent	Percy Ewart Davies	Unopposed		
Independent hold		Swing		

=== Llanddewi Brefi ===
Llanddewi Brefi 1958
Party	Candidate	Votes	%	±%
Independent	William Morgan Davies*	Unopposed		
Independent hold		Swing		

=== Llandygwydd ===
Llandygwydd 1958
Party	Candidate	Votes	%	±%
Independent	Melbourne Evan Griffiths*	Unopposed		
Independent hold		Swing		

=== Llandysul North ===
Llandysul North 1958
Party	Candidate	Votes	%	±%
Independent	Griffith Davies*	Unopposed		
Independent hold		Swing		

=== Llandysul South ===
Llandysul South 1958
Party	Candidate	Votes	%	±%
Independent	Edward Lewis*	Unopposed		
Independent hold		Swing		

=== Llansysiliogogo ===
Llandysiliogogo 1958
Party	Candidate	Votes	%	±%
Independent	Ben Thomas*	Unopposed		
Independent hold		Swing		

=== Llanfair Clydogau ===
Llanfair Clydogau 1958
Party	Candidate	Votes	%	±%
Independent	Daniel Owen Morgan*	Unopposed		
Independent hold		Swing		

=== Llanfarian ===
Llanfarian 1958
Party	Candidate	Votes	%	±%
Independent	John Herbert Daniel Matthews*	Unopposed		
Independent hold		Swing		

=== Llanfihangel y Creuddyn ===
Llanfihangel y Creuddyn 1958
Party	Candidate	Votes	%	±%
Independent	David Howell Jones*	Unopposed		
Independent hold		Swing		

=== Llangoedmor ===
Llangoedmor 1958
Party	Candidate	Votes	%	±%
Independent	Evan Davies*	Unopposed		
Independent hold		Swing		

=== Llangeitho ===
Llangeitho 1958
Party	Candidate	Votes	%	±%
Independent	David Lloyd*	Unopposed		
Independent hold		Swing		

=== Llangrannog ===
Llangrannog 1958
Party	Candidate	Votes	%	±%
Independent	Benjamin Griffiths*	Unopposed		
Independent hold		Swing		

=== Llanilar ===
Llanilar 1958
Party	Candidate	Votes	%	±%
Independent	David Charles Morgan*	Unopposed		
Independent hold		Swing		

=== Llanrhystyd ===
Llanrhystyd 1958
Party	Candidate	Votes	%	±%
Independent	Idwal James	Unopposed		
Independent	Jenkin Griffiths*	241		
Majority		25		
Independent gain from Independent		Swing		

=== Llanllwchaiarn ===
Llanllwchaiarn 1958
Party	Candidate	Votes	%	±%
Independent	David Owen Williams+	Unopposed		
Independent hold		Swing		

=== Llansantffraed ===
Llansantffraed 1958
Party	Candidate	Votes	%	±%
Independent	G.T. Davies*	Unopposed		
Independent	Brinley Jenkins Jones	178		
Majority		176		
Independent hold		Swing		

=== Llanwnen ===
Llanwnen 1958
Party	Candidate	Votes	%	±%
Independent	William Grey Hughes*	Unopposed		
Independent hold		Swing		

=== Llanwenog ===
Llanwenog 1958
Party	Candidate	Votes	%	±%
Independent	Thomas Donald Gwarnant Williams*	Unopposed		
Independent hold		Swing		

=== Lledrod ===
Lledrod 1958
Party	Candidate	Votes	%	±%
Independent	John David Herbert*	Unopposed		
Independent hold		Swing		

=== Nantcwnlle ===
Nantcwnlle 1958
Party	Candidate	Votes	%	±%
Independent	John Edwardes Rogers Lewis*	Unopposed		
Independent hold		Swing		

=== New Quay ===
New Quay 1958
Party	Candidate	Votes	%	±%
Independent	John Owen Williams*	Unopposed		

=== Penbryn ===
Penbryn 1958
Party	Candidate	Votes	%	±%
Independent	Morgan Lloyd Jenkins*	Unopposed		
Independent hold		Swing		

=== Strata Florida ===
Strata Florida 1958
Party	Candidate	Votes	%	±%
Independent	Owen Davies	Unopposed		
Independent	J.G. Williams	194		
Majority		81		
Independent hold		Swing		

=== Taliesin ===
Taliesin 1958
Party	Candidate	Votes	%	±%
Independent	Gwilym Caradog Jones*	Unopposed		
Independent hold		Swing		

=== Talybont ===
Talybont 1958
Party	Candidate	Votes	%	±%
Independent	Isaac Richard Jenkins*	Unopposed		
Independent hold		Swing		

=== Trefeurig ===
Trefeurig 1958
Party	Candidate	Votes	%	±%
Independent	Jenkin Davies*	Unopposed		
Independent hold		Swing		

=== Tregaron ===
Tregaron 1958
Party	Candidate	Votes	%	±%
Independent	John Lewis	Unopposed		
Independent hold		Swing		

=== Troedyraur ===
Troedyraur 1958
Party	Candidate	Votes	%	±%
Independent	Hywel Heulyn Roberts*	Unopposed		
Independent gain from Independent		Swing		

=== Ysbyty Ystwyth ===
Ysbyty Ystwyth 1958
Party	Candidate	Votes	%	±%
Independent	Thomas Caradog Edwards*	Unopposed		
Independent	John Jones	157		
Majority		31		
Independent hold		Swing		

== Election of Aldermen ==
In addition to the 50 councillors the council consisted of 16 county aldermen. Aldermen were elected by the council, and served a six-year term. Following the 1955 election, there were eight aldermanic vacancies which were filled at the annual meeting.

The following retiring aldermen was re-elected:

- D.R. Morgan, Bow Street
- Mrs G.C. Evans, Aberystwyth
- Capt. D. Oswald Davies, New Quay

In addition, the following new aldermen were elected:

- Isaac R. Lewis, Capel Bangor
- J.E. Rogers-Lewis, Abermeurig
- W.G. Hughes, Silian
- Griffith Davies, Pontshaen
- Rev Tegryn Davies, Aberporth

Evan Evans, Cilcennin, stood down after over thirty years as a member of the council

== By-elections ==
Eight by-elections were called following the election of aldermen. Four of the wards were contested. At Bow Street, the retiring councillor who had stood down in favour of long-serviong alderman D.R. Morgan was returned unopposed.

=== Aberporth by-election ===
Aberporth by-election 1958
Party	Candidate	Votes	%	±%
Independent	Rev Tegryn Davies	Unopposed		
Independent hold		Swing		

=== Aberystwyth Division 3 by-election ===
Aberystwyth Division 5 by-election 1958
Party	Candidate	Votes	%	±%
Independent	Ryland Kenneth Clues	307		
Independent	Brinley L. Jones	203		
Majority		104		
Independent hold		Swing		

=== Bow Street by-election ===
Bow Street by-election 1958
Party	Candidate	Votes	%	±%
Independent	Bodin Trevor Williams*	Unopposed		
Independent hold		Swing		

=== Goginan by-election ===
Goginan by-election 1958
Party	Candidate	Votes	%	±%
Independent	Llewelyn B. Bebb	Unopposed		
Independent hold		Swing		

=== Llanllwchaiarn by-election ===
Llanllwchaiarn by-election 1958
Party	Candidate	Votes	%	±%
Independent	Rev T.P. Jarman	Unopposed		
Independent hold		Swing		

=== Llanwnen by-election ===
Llanwnen by-election 1958
Party	Candidate	Votes	%	±%
Independent	William Lyn Jones	Unopposed		
Independent hold		Swing		

=== Nantcwnlle by-election ===
Nantcwnlle by-election 1958
Party	Candidate	Votes	%	±%
Independent	R.O. Williams	249		
Independent	Rev W.J. Davies	243		
Majority		6		
Independent hold		Swing		

=== Llandysul North by-election ===
Llandysul North by-election 1952
Party	Candidate	Votes	%	±%
Independent	Rev Victor Thomas	314		
Independent	John Williams	302		
Independent	Walter Cherry	96		
Majority		12		
Independent hold		Swing		
