= 1955 Cardiganshire County Council election =

1955 election in Cardiganshire, Wales

The twentieth election to Cardiganshire County Council took place on 2 April 1955. It was preceded by the 1952 election and followed by the 1958 election.

== Candidates ==
36 candidates were returned unopposed resulting in only fourteen contests. As was the case three years earlier it was reported that there was little appetite for contests, especially where retiring members sought re-election.

Eight aldermen retired, of whom five sought election. Alderman Simon Davies, Felinfach, announced that he had reluctantly decided to retire from public life at the age of 84 after 33 years as a member of the council. At Devil's Bridge, Llangeitho and Llanwenog the retiring councillors stood down in favour of the retiring aldermen.

== Outcome ==
The fourteen contests were fought on non-political lines, with three retiring members being defeated. These included Alderman Emlyn Abraham Williams, who was heavily defeated at Aberystwyth.

== Results ==
=== Aberaeron ===
Aberaeron 1955
Party	Candidate	Votes	%	±%
Independent	Evan John Thomas*	590		
Independent	Capt. D. Herbert	206		
Majority		384		
Independent hold		Swing		

=== Aberbanc ===
Aberbanc 1955
Party	Candidate	Votes	%	±%
Independent	Benjamin John Davies*	Unopposed		
Independent hold		Swing		

=== Aberporth ===
Aberporth 1955
Party	Candidate	Votes	%	±%
Independent	Rev Tegryn Davies*	Unopposed		
Independent hold		Swing		

=== Aberystwyth Division 1 ===
Aberystwyth Division 1 1955
Party	Candidate	Votes	%	±%
Labour	John John*	Unopposed		
Labour hold		Swing		

=== Aberystwyth Division 2 ===
Aberystwyth Division 2 1955
Party	Candidate	Votes	%	±%
Independent	W.G. Pryse	391		
Independent	Richard Jones	290		
Majority		101		
Independent hold		Swing		

=== Aberystwyth Division 3 ===
Aberystwyth Division 3 1955
Party	Candidate	Votes	%	±%
Independent	Ryland Kenneth Clues*	386		
Independent hold		Swing		

=== Aberystwyth Division 4 ===
Aberystwyth Division 4 1955
Party	Candidate	Votes	%	±%
Independent	Benjamin Pryce*	Unopposed		
Independent hold		Swing		

=== Aberystwyth Division 5 ===
Aberystwyth Division 5 1955
Party	Candidate	Votes	%	±%
Independent	Richard Jenkin Ellis*	528		
Independent	Emlyn Abraham-Williams+	146		
Majority		382		
Independent hold		Swing		

=== Aberystwyth Division 6 ===
Aberystwyth Division 6 1955
Party	Candidate	Votes	%	±%
Independent	Gwendolen Eluned Jones*	Unopposed		
Independent hold		Swing		

=== Aeron ===
Aeron 1955
Party	Candidate	Votes	%	±%
Independent	Evan Glyn Davies*	Unopposed		
Independent hold		Swing		

=== Borth ===
Borth 1955
Party	Candidate	Votes	%	±%
Independent	W. Jones Morris	726		
Independent	Samuel Joseph John Jones*	91		
Majority		635		
Independent gain from Independent		Swing		

=== Bow Street ===
Bow Street 1955
Party	Candidate	Votes	%	±%
Independent	Bodin Trevor Williams*	Unopposed		
Independent hold		Swing		

=== Cardigan North ===
Cardigan North 1955
Party	Candidate	Votes	%	±%
Independent	Arthur Thomas	560		
Independent	G.J. James	485		
Majority		75		
Independent hold		Swing		

=== Cardigan South ===
Cardigan South 1955
Party	Candidate	Votes	%	±%
Independent	Albert Hallam	255		
Independent	J.R. Daniel	220		
Independent	Benjamin Lewis	148		
Independent	J.E. Sallis	45		
Majority		35		
Independent hold		Swing		

=== Cilcennin ===
Cilcennin 1955
Party	Candidate	Votes	%	±%
Independent	William Jenkin Jones	246		
Independent	Isaac Eilwyn Jones	207		
Independent	Benjamin Thomas	84		
Independent	John Lewis	31		
Majority		39		
Independent hold		Swing		

=== Cwmrheidol ===
Cwmrheidol 1955
Party	Candidate	Votes	%	±%
Independent	Geraint Wyn Howells*	172		
Independent	Isaac Richard Howells	121		
Majority		51		
Independent hold		Swing		

=== Devil's Bridge ===
Devil's Bridge 1955
Party	Candidate	Votes	%	±%
Independent	Rev D.L. Evans+	Unopposed		
Independent hold		Swing		

=== Felinfach ===
Felinfach 1955
Party	Candidate	Votes	%	±%
Independent	Thomas Davies*	504		
Independent	Capt. J. Hext Lewes	326		
Majority		178		
Independent hold		Swing		

=== Goginan ===
Goginan 1955
Party	Candidate	Votes	%	±%
Independent	Isaac Richard Lewis*	Unopposed		
Independent hold		Swing		

=== Lampeter Borough ===
Lampeter Borough 1955
Party	Candidate	Votes	%	±%
Independent	Rev T. Oswald Williams*	781		
Independent	G.G. Quan	229		
Independent	D.D. Rees	28		
Majority		552		
Independent hold		Swing		

=== Llanarth ===
Llanarth 1952
Party	Candidate	Votes	%	±%
Independent	Rev. Edwin Pryce Jones	441		
Independent	David Christmas Evans*	333		
Majority		108		
Independent gain from		Swing		

=== Llanbadarn Fawr ===
Llanbadarn Fawr 1955
Party	Candidate	Votes	%	±%
Independent	Emile Thomas Evans*	Unopposed		
Independent hold		Swing		

=== Llanddewi Brefi ===
Llanddewi Brefi 1955
Party	Candidate	Votes	%	±%
Independent	William Morgan Davies*	Unopposed		
Independent hold		Swing		

=== Llandygwydd ===
Llandygwydd 1955
Party	Candidate	Votes	%	±%
Independent	Edward Lloyd Davies*	Unopposed		
Independent hold		Swing		

=== Llandysul North ===
Llandysul North 1955
Party	Candidate	Votes	%	±%
Independent	Griffith Davies*	Unopposed		
Independent hold		Swing		

=== Llandysul South ===
Llandysul South 1955
Party	Candidate	Votes	%	±%
Independent	Edward Lewis*	Unopposed		
Independent hold		Swing		

=== Llansysiliogogo ===
Llandysiliogogo 1955
Party	Candidate	Votes	%	±%
Independent	Ben Thomas*	Unopposed		
Independent hold		Swing		

=== Llanfair Clydogau ===
Llanfair Clydogau 1955
Party	Candidate	Votes	%	±%
Independent	Daniel Owen Morgan*	Unopposed		
Independent hold		Swing		

=== Llanfarian ===
Llanfarian 1955
Party	Candidate	Votes	%	±%
Independent	John Herbert Daniel Matthews*	Unopposed		
Independent hold		Swing		

=== Llanfihangel y Creuddyn ===
Llanfihangel y Creuddyn 1955
Party	Candidate	Votes	%	±%
Independent	David Howell Jones*	Unopposed		
Independent hold		Swing		

=== Llangoedmor ===
Llangoedmor 1955
Party	Candidate	Votes	%	±%
Independent	Edward Howard Lloyd*	Unopposed		
Independent hold		Swing		

=== Llangeitho ===
Llangeitho 1955
Party	Candidate	Votes	%	±%
Independent	Daniel Lodwick Herbert+	Unopposed		
Independent hold		Swing		

=== Llangrannog ===
Llangrannog 1955
Party	Candidate	Votes	%	±%
Independent	Benjamin Griffiths*	Unopposed		
Independent hold		Swing		

=== Llanilar ===
Llanilar 1955
Party	Candidate	Votes	%	±%
Independent	David Charles Morgan	246		
Independent	J. Gatty Pugh Lewis	187		
Independent	Mrs E.E. Phillips	152		
Majority		59		
Independent hold		Swing		

=== Llanrhystyd ===
Llanrhystyd 1955
Party	Candidate	Votes	%	±%
Independent	Jenkin Griffiths*	Unopposed		
Independent hold		Swing		

=== Llanllwchaiarn ===
Llanllwchaiarn 1955
Party	Candidate	Votes	%	±%
Independent	David Owen Williams*	Unopposed		
Independent hold		Swing		

=== Llansantffraed ===
Llansantffraed 1955
Party	Candidate	Votes	%	±%
Independent	G.T. Davies*	Unopposed		
Independent hold		Swing		

=== Llanwnen ===
Llanwnen 1955
Party	Candidate	Votes	%	±%
Independent	William Grey Hughes*	Unopposed		
Independent hold		Swing		

=== Llanwenog ===
Llanwenog 1955
Party	Candidate	Votes	%	±%
Independent	Meredith Gwarnant Williams+	Unopposed		
Independent hold		Swing		

=== Lledrod ===
Lledrod 1955
Party	Candidate	Votes	%	±%
Independent	John David Herbert	321		
Independent	Mrs R.M.B. Kydd	118		
Independent	W.J. Capener	40		
Independent hold		Swing		

=== Nantcwnlle ===
Nantcwnlle 1955
Party	Candidate	Votes	%	±%
Independent	John Edwardes Rogers Lewis*	Unopposed		
Independent hold		Swing		

=== New Quay ===
New Quay 1955
Party	Candidate	Votes	%	±%
Independent	Rev H.J. Victor Thomas*	Unopposed		
Independent	J.O. Williams	337		
Independent hold		Swing		

=== Penbryn ===
Penbryn 1955
Party	Candidate	Votes	%	±%
Independent	Morgan Lloyd Jenkins*	Unopposed		
Independent hold		Swing		

=== Strata Florida ===
Strata Florida 1955
Party	Candidate	Votes	%	±%
Independent	Emrys S. Lloyd*	Unopposed		
Independent hold		Swing		

=== Taliesin ===
Taliesin 1955
Party	Candidate	Votes	%	±%
Independent	Gwilym Caradog Jones*	Unopposed		
Independent hold		Swing		

=== Talybont ===
Talybont 1955
Party	Candidate	Votes	%	±%
Independent	Isaac Richard Jenkins*	Unopposed		
Independent hold		Swing		

=== Trefeurig ===
Trefeurig 1955
Party	Candidate	Votes	%	±%
Independent	Jenkin Davies*	Unopposed		
Independent hold		Swing		

=== Tregaron ===
Tregaron 1955
Party	Candidate	Votes	%	±%
Independent	Rev David Thomas Jones*	Unopposed		
Independent hold		Swing		

=== Troedyraur ===
Troedyraur 1955
Party	Candidate	Votes	%	±%
Independent	Hywel Heulyn Roberts*	Unopposed		
Independent hold		Swing		

=== Ysbyty Ystwyth ===
Ysbyty Ystwyth 1955
Party	Candidate	Votes	%	±%
Independent	Thomas Caradog Edwards*	Unopposed		
Independent hold		Swing		

== Election of Aldermen ==
In addition to the 50 councillors the council consisted of 16 county aldermen. Aldermen were elected by the council, and served a six-year term. Following the 1955 election, there were eight aldermanic vacancies which were filled at the annual meeting. The following retiring aldermen were re-elected:

- Rev D.L. Evans, Devil's Bridge
- D.L. Herbert, Llangeitho
- W.Z. Jones, Llanfarian
- Meredydd Ll.G. Williams, Llanwenog

In addition, the following four new aldermen were elected:

- Benjamin John Davies, Llandyfriog
- Edward Lloyd Davies, Beulah
- Evan Glyn Davies, Aberarth
- John John, Aberystwyth

John John was the sole Labour member of the council and the first Labour councillor to be elevated to the aldermanic bench in Cardiganshire.

== By-elections ==
Two contested by-elections were held to fill aldermanic vacancies.

=== Aberbanc by-election ===
Aberbanc by-election 1955
Party	Candidate	Votes	%	±%
Independent	Dr Stanley George Budd	Unopposed		
Independent hold		Swing		

=== Devil's Bridge by-election ===
Devil's Bridge by-election 1955
Party	Candidate	Votes	%	±%
Independent	Ivor Charles Williams	Unopposed		
Independent hold		Swing		

=== Llandygwydd by-election ===
Llandygwydd by-election 1955
Party	Candidate	Votes	%	±%
Independent	Melbourne Evan Griffiths	Unopposed		
Independent hold		Swing		

=== Llangeitho by-election ===
Llangeitho by-election 1955
Party	Candidate	Votes	%	±%
Independent	David Lloyd*	Unopposed		
Independent hold		Swing		

=== Llangoedmor by-election ===
Llangoedmor by-election 1955
Party	Candidate	Votes	%	±%
Independent	Evan Davies	Unopposed		
Independent hold		Swing		

=== Llanwenog by-election ===
Llanwenog by-election 1955
Party	Candidate	Votes	%	±%
Independent	Thomas Donald Gwarnant Williams*	Unopposed		
Independent hold		Swing		
