= 1964 Cardiganshire County Council election =

1964 Welsh local government election

The twenty-second election to Cardiganshire County Council took place in April 1961. It was preceded by the 1961 election and followed by the 1967 election.

== Candidates ==
After a record low of four contests in 1961 a significantly higher number of seats were contested, with Plaid Cymru candidates contesting wards in Aberystwyth for the first time. Retiring councillors stood down in favour of aldermen in several wards.

== Outcome ==
Four retiring members were defeated with the only surprise in Lampeter where the Rev T. Oswald Williams was defeated by Dr Ambrose Lloyd

== Results ==
=== Aberaeron ===
Aberaeron 1964
Party	Candidate	Votes	%	±%
Independent	Thomas Glyn Griffith Herbert*	Unopposed		
Independent hold		Swing		

=== Aberbanc ===
Aberbanc 1964
Party	Candidate	Votes	%	±%
Independent	Benjamin J. Davies*	Unopposed		
Independent hold		Swing		

=== Aberporth ===
Aberporth 1964
Party	Candidate	Votes	%	±%
Independent	Rev Tegryn Davies+	Unopposed		
Independent hold		Swing		

=== Aberystwyth Division 1 ===
Aberystwyth Division 1 1961
Party	Candidate	Votes	%	±%
Independent	David Morgan	304		
Independent	Thelma M. Hoskins*	294		
Plaid Cymru	Edward G. Millward	225		
Majority		10		
Independent gain from Labour		Swing		

=== Aberystwyth Division 2 ===
Aberystwyth Division 2 1964
Party	Candidate	Votes	%	±%
Independent	Gwendoline Calan Evans+	Unopposed		
Independent hold		Swing		

=== Aberystwyth Division 3 ===
Aberystwyth Division 3 1964
Party	Candidate	Votes	%	±%
Independent	Ryland Kenneth Clues*	386		
Independent hold		Swing		

=== Aberystwyth Division 4 ===
Aberystwyth Division 4 1964
Party	Candidate	Votes	%	±%
Independent	Richard Rowlands*	332		
Plaid Cymru	T. Hywel Moseley	206		
Majority		126		
Independent hold		Swing		

=== Aberystwyth Division 5 ===
Aberystwyth Division 5 1964
Party	Candidate	Votes	%	±%
Independent	Richard Jenkin Ellis*	371		
Plaid Cymru	Lilli M. Thomas	205		
Majority		166		
Independent hold		Swing		

=== Aberystwyth Division 6 ===
Aberystwyth Division 6 1964
Party	Candidate	Votes	%	±%
Independent	Griffith Davies*	Unopposed		
Independent hold		Swing		

=== Aeron ===
Aeron 1964
Party	Candidate	Votes	%	±%
Independent	Evan Glyn Davies*	Unopposed		
Independent hold		Swing		

=== Borth ===
Borth 1964
Party	Candidate	Votes	%	±%
Independent	James Owen Morgan	Unopposed		
Independent	David Gareth Raw-Rees	358		
Majority		195		
Independent hold		Swing		

=== Bow Street ===
Bow Street 1961
Party	Candidate	Votes	%	±%
Independent	Alexander Ll. Lyon Jones	Unopposed		
Independent	David William Thomas	182		
Majority		128		
Independent hold		Swing		

=== Cardigan North ===
Cardigan North 1964
Party	Candidate	Votes	%	±%
Independent	Gwilym Morris*	Unopposed		
Independent hold		Swing		

=== Cardigan South ===
Cardigan South 1964
Party	Candidate	Votes	%	±%
Independent	Benjamin Lewis*	Unopposed		
Independent hold		Swing		

=== Cilcennin ===
Cilcennin 1964
Party	Candidate	Votes	%	±%
Independent	Isaac E. Jones*	309		
Independent	Mary E. Jarman	205		
Majority		104		
Independent hold		Swing		

=== Cwmrheidol ===
Cwmrheidol 1964
Party	Candidate	Votes	%	±%
Independent	Geraint Wyn Howells*	Unopposed		
Independent hold		Swing		

=== Devil's Bridge ===
Devil's Bridge 1964
Party	Candidate	Votes	%	±%
Independent	Thomas Islwyn Lloyd*	Unopposed		
Independent hold		Swing		

=== Felinfach ===
Felinfach 1964
Party	Candidate	Votes	%	±%
Independent	David Taliesin Rees*	Unopposed		
Independent hold		Swing		

=== Goginan ===
Goginan 1964
Party	Candidate	Votes	%	±%
Independent	Llewellyn Breeze Bebb*	Unopposed		
Independent hold		Swing		

=== Lampeter Borough ===
Lampeter Borough 1964
Party	Candidate	Votes	%	±%
Independent	Ambrose Goring Lloyd	609		
Independent	Rev T. Oswald Williams*	518		
Majority		91		
Independent gain from Independent		Swing		

=== Llanarth ===
Llanarth 1964
Party	Candidate	Votes	%	±%
Independent	Rev. Edwin Pryce Jones*	Unopposed		
Independent hold		Swing		

=== Llanbadarn Fawr ===
Llanbadarn Fawr 1964
Party	Candidate	Votes	%	±%
Independent	Percy Ewart Davies	420		
Independent	Robin E. Evans	188		
Majority		232		
Independent hold		Swing		

=== Llanddewi Brefi ===
Llanddewi Brefi 1964
Party	Candidate	Votes	%	±%
Independent	Edward Jenkin Davies	230		
Independent	Charles Emlyn Jones*	185		
Majority		45		
Independent hold		Swing		

=== Llandygwydd ===
Llandygwydd 1964
Party	Candidate	Votes	%	±%
Independent	Melbourne Evan Griffiths*	Unopposed		
Independent hold		Swing		

=== Llandysul North ===
Llandysul North 1964
Party	Candidate	Votes	%	±%
Independent	Henry Phillip Davies	326		
Independent	Evan Rees Evans	198		
Majority		128		
Independent hold		Swing		

=== Llandysul South ===
Llandysul South 1964
Party	Candidate	Votes	%	±%
Independent	Edward Lewis	Unopposed		
Independent hold		Swing		

=== Llansysiliogogo ===
Llandysiliogogo 1964
Party	Candidate	Votes	%	±%
Independent	Ben Thomas*	Unopposed		
Independent hold		Swing		

=== Llanfair Clydogau ===
Llanfair Clydogau 1964
Party	Candidate	Votes	%	±%
Independent	Daniel Owen Morgan*	Unopposed		
Independent hold		Swing		

=== Llanfarian ===
Llanfarian 1964
Party	Candidate	Votes	%	±%
Independent	John Herbert Daniel Matthews*	Unopposed		
Independent hold		Swing		

=== Llanfihangel y Creuddyn ===
Llanfihangel y Creuddyn 1964
Party	Candidate	Votes	%	±%
Independent	Rev John Harold Rees*	Unopposed		
Independent hold		Swing		

=== Llangoedmor ===
Llangoedmor 1964
Party	Candidate	Votes	%	±%
Independent	J.J. Jones*	Unopposed		
Independent hold		Swing		

=== Llangeitho ===
Llangeitho 1964
Party	Candidate	Votes	%	±%
Independent	David Lloyd*	Unopposed		
Independent hold		Swing		

=== Llangrannog ===
Llangrannog 1964
Party	Candidate	Votes	%	±%
Independent	Capt. Robert Arthur Evans	Unopposed		
Independent hold		Swing		

=== Llanilar ===
Llanilar 1964
Party	Candidate	Votes	%	±%
Independent	David Charles Morgan*	Unopposed		
Independent hold		Swing		

=== Llanrhystyd ===
Llanrhystyd 1964
Party	Candidate	Votes	%	±%
Independent	Rev Matthew M. Griffiths	316		
Independent	Idwal James*	171		
Majority		145		
Independent gain from Independent		Swing		

=== Llanllwchaiarn ===
Llanllwchaiarn 1964
Party	Candidate	Votes	%	±%
Independent	Rev Thomas Pugh Jarman*	Unopposed		
Independent hold		Swing		

=== Llansantffraed ===
Llansantffraed 1964
Party	Candidate	Votes	%	±%
Independent	Gwilym Thomas Davies*	354		
Independent hold		Swing		

=== Llanwnen ===
Llanwnen 1964
Party	Candidate	Votes	%	±%
Independent	William Lynn Jones*	Unopposed		
Independent hold		Swing		

=== Llanwenog ===
Llanwenog 1964
Party	Candidate	Votes	%	±%
Independent	Thomas Donald Gwarnant Williams*	Unopposed		
Independent hold		Swing		

=== Lledrod ===
Lledrod 1964
Party	Candidate	Votes	%	±%
Independent	John David Herbert*	Unopposed		
Independent hold		Swing		

=== Nantcwnlle ===
Nantcwnlle 1964
Party	Candidate	Votes	%	±%
Independent	John Edwardes Rogers-Lewis+	Unopposed		
Independent hold		Swing		

=== New Quay ===
New Quay 1964
Party	Candidate	Votes	%	±%
Independent	John Owen Williams*	Unopposed		

=== Penbryn ===
Penbryn 1964
Party	Candidate	Votes	%	±%
Independent	John Owen James Davies*	Unopposed		
Independent hold		Swing		

=== Strata Florida ===
Strata Florida 1964
Party	Candidate	Votes	%	±%
Independent	W.H. Rhidian Llewellyn*	Unopposed		
Independent	Dan John Arch	157		
Majority		97		
Independent hold		Swing		

=== Taliesin ===
Taliesin 1964
Party	Candidate	Votes	%	±%
Independent	Gwilym Caradog Jones*	Unopposed		
Independent hold		Swing		

=== Talybont ===
Talybont 1964
Party	Candidate	Votes	%	±%
Independent	Isaac Richard Jenkins*	Unopposed		
Independent hold		Swing		

=== Trefeurig ===
Trefeurig 1964
Party	Candidate	Votes	%	±%
Independent	Reginald Holdcroft	Unopposed		
Independent hold		Swing		

=== Tregaron ===
Tregaron 1964
Party	Candidate	Votes	%	±%
Independent	John Lewis*	Unopposed		
Independent hold		Swing		

=== Troedyraur ===
Troedyraur 1964
Party	Candidate	Votes	%	±%
Independent	Hywel Heulyn Roberts*	Unopposed		
Independent hold		Swing		

=== Ysbyty Ystwyth ===
Ysbyty Ystwyth 1964
Party	Candidate	Votes	%	±%
Independent	Thomas Caradog Edwards*	Unopposed		
Independent hold		Swing		

== Election of Aldermen ==
In addition to the 50 councillors the council consisted of 16 county aldermen. Aldermen were elected by the council, and served a six-year term. Following the 1961election, there were eight aldermanic vacancies which were filled at the annual meeting.

The following retiring alderman was re-elected:

- D.R. Morgan, Bow Street (also elected a life alderman)
- Mrs G.C. Evans, Aberystwyth
- Capt. D. Oswald Davies, New Quay

In addition, the following new aldermen were elected:

- D.O. Morgan, Coedparc
- Ben Thomas. Caerwedros
- Hywel Helen Roberts, Troedyraur
- M.E. Griffiths, Blaenporth
- R.J. Ellis, Aberystwyth
- David Lloyd, Llangeitho
- L.R. Jenkins, Talybont

The following retiring aldermen were re-elected to the council but not selected as aldermen

- J.E. Rogers-Lewis, Abermeurig
- Rev Tegryn Davies, Aberporth

== By-elections ==
Six by-elections were called following the election of aldermen. Five of the wards were contested in elections held on 3 June. At Llanfarian, the former councillor who had stood down in favour of Alderman W.Z. Jones was returned unopposed. There were no vacancies in the other two wards due to the incumbents being life aldermen.

=== Aberaeron by-election ===
Aberaeron by-election 1961
Party	Candidate	Votes	%	±%
Independent	Thomas Glyn Griffiths Herbert	537		
Independent	John Jordan Jones	198		
Independent	Phyllis W. Sewell	67		
Majority		339		
Independent hold		Swing		

=== Aberystwyth Division 6 by-election ===
Aberystwyth Division 6 by-election 1961
Party	Candidate	Votes	%	±%
Independent	Griffith Davies	357		
Independent	Graham B.J. Hughes	198		
Majority		159		
Independent hold		Swing		

=== Llanddewi Brefi by-election ===
Llanddewi Brefi by-election 1961
Party	Candidate	Votes	%	±%
Independent	Charles Emlyn Jones	226		
Independent	Edward Jenkin Davies	185		
Independent	Daniel James Jones	32		
Majority		41		
Independent hold		Swing		

=== Llanfarian by-election ===
Llanfarian by-election 1961
Party	Candidate	Votes	%	±%
Independent	J.D.H. Matthews*	Unopposed		
Independent hold		Swing		

=== Llanfihangel-y-Creuddyn by-election ===
Llanfihangel-y-Creuddyn by-election 1961
Party	Candidate	Votes	%	±%
Independent	Rev John Harold Rees	319		
Independent	Richard Evan Richards	204		
Majority		115		
Independent hold		Swing		

=== Penbryn by-election ===
Penbryn by-election 1961
Party	Candidate	Votes	%	±%
Independent	John Owen James Davies	437		
Independent	Nellie Eirwen Evans	158		
Majority		279		
Independent hold		Swing		
