= List of Green Party of England and Wales MPs and peers =

This is a list of current and former representatives of the Green Party of England and Wales in the UK Parliament. Members of the London Assembly, potential future members of the Senedd and members of local councils are not listed. The Scottish Green Party and the Green Party Northern Ireland are separate sister parties from the Green Party of England and Wales.

== Members of Parliament ==
Portrait	Member	Constituency	Served from	Served to	Term length
	Cynog Dafis (Note: Dafis was elected on a joint ticket between the Green Party and Plaid Cymru in the 1992 general election and officially sat in Parliament as a member of both parties. Given Dafis' membership of both parties, Caroline Lucas, who was elected as the Green Party Member of Parliament for Brighton Pavilion, is typically regarded as the first Green MP.)	Ceredigion and Pembroke North	9 April 1992	8 April 1997	4 years, 364 days
	Caroline Lucas	Brighton Pavilion	6 May 2010	30 May 2024	14 years, 24 days
	Siân Berry	Brighton Pavilion	4 July 2024	Incumbent	1 year, 281 days
	Adrian Ramsay	Waveney Valley	4 July 2024	Incumbent	1 year, 281 days
	Carla Denyer	Bristol Central	4 July 2024	Incumbent	1 year, 281 days
	Ellie Chowns	North Herefordshire	4 July 2024	Incumbent	1 year, 281 days
	Hannah Spencer	Gorton and Denton	26 February 2026	Incumbent	44 days

== House of Lords ==
Portrait	Name	Title	Served from	Served to	Term length
	George MacLeod (Note: MacLeod initially sat on the crossbenches, before becoming an Ecology Party and then Green Party peer. He became a member of the Green Party of England and Wales when it was formed in 1990.)	Lord MacLeod of Fuinary	6 February 1967	27 June 1991	24 years, 141 days
	Tim Beaumont (Note: Beaumont initially became a Liberal lord, before becoming a Liberal Democrat lord following the party's formation in 1988. He defected to the Green Party in 1999.)	Lord Beaumont of Whitley	6 December 1967	8 April 2008	40 years, 124 days
	Jenny Jones	Baroness Jones of Moulsecoomb	5 November 2013	Incumbent	12 years, 157 days
	Natalie Bennett	Baroness Bennett of Manor Castle	15 October 2019	Incumbent	6 years, 178 days
