= Pen-cae =

Village in Ceredigion, Wales

Coordinates: 52.184891°N 4.297294°W

- Location within Ceredigion
- OS grid reference: SN 4304 5656
  - Cardiff: 68.2 mi (109.8 km)
  - London: 184 mi (296 km)
- Community: Llanarth
- Principal area: Ceredigion
- Country: Wales
- Sovereign state: United Kingdom
- Post town: Llanarth
- Postcode district: SA47
- Police: Dyfed-Powys
- Fire: Mid and West Wales
- Ambulance: Welsh
- UK Parliament: Ceredigion Preseli
- Senedd Cymru – Welsh Parliament: Ceredigion Penfro

Pen-cae (also spelled as Pencae) is a village in the community of Llanarth, Ceredigion, Wales, which is 68.2 miles (109.8 km) from Cardiff and 184 miles (296 km) from London. Pen-cae is represented in the Senedd by Elin Jones (Plaid Cymru) and is part of the Ceredigion Preseli constituency in the House of Commons.

== See also ==
- Strumble Head
- List of localities in Wales by population
