= 1952 Cardiganshire County Council election =

1952 Welsh local election

The nineteenth election to Cardiganshire County Council took place in April 1952. It was preceded by the 1949 election and followed by the 1955 election.

== Candidates ==
38 candidates were returned unopposed resulting in only twelve contests. This was three fewer than in 1949. It was stated in the local press that interest in the county council was declining and that councillors would soon need to be paid like the officials.

Eight aldermen retired, of whom four sought election. At Bow Street and Goginan, the retiring councillors stood down in favour of the retiring aldermen.

== Outcome ==
Of the ten contests, the striking result was the defeat of the chairman-elect, Morgan Jones at Strata Florida. Jones, a retiring alderman and member since 1928 was opposed and defeated by retiring councillor Emrys Lloyd. The sitting members at Cwmrheidol and Troedyraur were also defeated.

== Results ==
=== Aberaeron ===
Aberaeron 1952
Party	Candidate	Votes	%	±%
Independent	Evan John Thomas	Unopposed		
Independent hold		Swing		

=== Aberbanc ===
Aberbanc 1952
Party	Candidate	Votes	%	±%
Independent	Benjamin John Davies*	Unopposed		
Independent hold		Swing		

=== Aberporth ===
Aberporth 1952
Party	Candidate	Votes	%	±%
Independent	Rev Evan Melinfab Lewis*	Unopposed		
Independent hold		Swing		

=== Aberystwyth Division 1 ===
Aberystwyth Division 1 1952
Party	Candidate	Votes	%	±%
Labour	John John	Unopposed		
Labour hold		Swing		

=== Aberystwyth Division 2 ===
Aberystwyth Division 2 1952
Party	Candidate	Votes	%	±%
Independent	Gwendoline Calan Evans*	Unopposed		
Independent hold		Swing		

=== Aberystwyth Division 3 ===
Aberystwyth Division 3 1952
Party	Candidate	Votes	%	±%
Independent	Catherine Mary Lewis Evans+	386		
Independent hold		Swing		

=== Aberystwyth Division 4 ===
Aberystwyth Division 4 1952
Party	Candidate	Votes	%	±%
Independent	Benjamin Pryce	Unopposed		
Independent hold		Swing		

=== Aberystwyth Division 5 ===
Aberystwyth Division 5 1952
Party	Candidate	Votes	%	±%
Independent	Richard Jenkin Ellis*	Unopposed		
Independent hold		Swing		

=== Aberystwyth Division 6 ===
Aberystwyth Division 6 1952
Party	Candidate	Votes	%	±%
Independent	Gwendolen Eluned Jones*	Unopposed		
Independent hold		Swing		

=== Aeron ===
Aeron 1952
Party	Candidate	Votes	%	±%
Independent	Evan Glyn Davies*	Unopposed		
Independent hold		Swing		

=== Borth ===
Borth 1952
Party	Candidate	Votes	%	±%
Independent	Samuel Joseph John Jones	Unopposed		
Independent hold		Swing		

=== Bow Street ===
Bow Street 1952
Party	Candidate	Votes	%	±%
Independent	David Rees Morgan+	Unopposed		
Independent hold		Swing		

=== Cardigan North ===
Cardigan North 1952
Party	Candidate	Votes	%	±%
Independent	Jenkin Richards	Unopposed		
Independent hold		Swing		

=== Cardigan South ===
Cardigan South 1952
Party	Candidate	Votes	%	±%
Independent	Robert Lionel Phillips*	Unopposed		
Independent hold		Swing		

=== Cilcennin ===
Cilcennin 1952
Party	Candidate	Votes	%	±%
Independent	Evan Evans*	Unopposed		
Independent hold		Swing		

=== Cwmrheidol ===
Cwmrheidol 1952
Party	Candidate	Votes	%	±%
Independent	Geraint Wyn Howells	164		
Independent	Isaac Richard Howells*	152		
Majority		12		
Independent gain from Independent		Swing		

=== Devil's Bridge ===
Devil's Bridge 1952
Party	Candidate	Votes	%	±%
Independent	Ivor C. Edwards	210		
Independent	Morgan Morgan	157		
Majority		53		
Independent hold		Swing		

=== Felinfach ===
Felinfach 1952
Party	Candidate	Votes	%	±%
Independent	Thomas Davies*	Unopposed		
Independent hold		Swing		

=== Goginan ===
Goginan 1952
Party	Candidate	Votes	%	±%
Independent	John Williams+	Unopposed		
Independent hold		Swing		

=== Lampeter Borough ===
Lampeter Borough 1952
Party	Candidate	Votes	%	±%
Independent	Rev T. Oswald Williams*	810		
Independent	David Evans	384		
Majority		426		
Independent hold		Swing		

=== Llanarth ===
Llanarth 1952
Party	Candidate	Votes	%	±%
Independent	David Christmas Evans*	413		
Independent	Rev. Edwin Pryce Jones	388		
Majority		25		
Independent hold		Swing		

=== Llanbadarn Fawr ===
Llanbadarn Fawr 1952
Party	Candidate	Votes	%	±%
Independent	Emile Thomas Evans*	Unopposed		
Independent hold		Swing		

=== Llanddewi Brefi ===
Llanddewi Brefi 1952
Party	Candidate	Votes	%	±%
Independent	William Morgan Davies*	Unopposed		
Independent hold		Swing		

=== Llandygwydd ===
Llandygwydd 1952
Party	Candidate	Votes	%	±%
Independent	Edward Lloyd Davies*	Unopposed		
Independent hold		Swing		

=== Llandysul North ===
Llandysul North 1952
Party	Candidate	Votes	%	±%
Independent	Griffith Davies*	Unopposed		
Independent hold		Swing		

=== Llandysul South ===
Llandysul South 1952
Party	Candidate	Votes	%	±%
Independent	Edward Lewis*	Unopposed		
Independent hold		Swing		

=== Llansysiliogogo ===
Llandysiliogogo 1952
Party	Candidate	Votes	%	±%
Independent	Ben Thomas*	Unopposed		
Independent hold		Swing		

=== Llanfair Clydogau ===
Llanfair Clydogau 1952
Party	Candidate	Votes	%	±%
Independent	Daniel Owen Morgan	Unopposed		
Independent hold		Swing		

=== Llanfarian ===
Llanfarian 1952
Party	Candidate	Votes	%	±%
Independent	John Herbert Daniel Matthews*	Unopposed		
Independent hold		Swing		

=== Llanfihangel y Creuddyn ===
Llanfihangel y Creuddyn 1952
Party	Candidate	Votes	%	±%
Independent	David Howell Jones*	Unopposed		
Independent hold		Swing		

=== Llangoedmor ===
Llangoedmor 1952
Party	Candidate	Votes	%	±%
Independent	Edward Howard Lloyd*	Unopposed		
Independent hold		Swing		

=== Llangeitho ===
Llangeitho 1952
Party	Candidate	Votes	%	±%
Independent	David Lloyd*	Unopposed		
Independent hold		Swing		

=== Llangrannog ===
Llangrannog 1952
Party	Candidate	Votes	%	±%
Independent	Benjamin Griffiths	177		
Independent	J. Davies	158		
Independent	J.J. Davies	125		
Independent	R.A. Evans	28		
Majority		19		
Independent hold		Swing		

=== Llanilar ===
Llanilar 1952
Party	Candidate	Votes	%	±%
Independent	David Morgan	364		
Independent	Elizabeth E. Phillips	216		
Majority		148		
Independent hold		Swing		

=== Llanrhystyd ===
Llanrhystyd 1952
Party	Candidate	Votes	%	±%
Independent	Jenkin Griffiths*	322		
Independent	David Charles Morgan	243		
Majority		79		
Independent hold		Swing		

=== Llanllwchaiarn ===
Llanllwchaiarn 1952
Party	Candidate	Votes	%	±%
Independent	David Owen Williams*	Unopposed		
Independent hold		Swing		

=== Llansantffraed ===
Llansantffraed 1949
Party	Candidate	Votes	%	±%
Independent	G.T. Davies	Unopposed		
Independent	D.M. Morris	217		
Majority		96		
Independent hold		Swing		

=== Llanwnen ===
Llanwnen 1952
Party	Candidate	Votes	%	±%
Independent	William Grey Hughes*	254		
Independent	William Lynn Jones	208		
Majority		40		
Independent hold		Swing		

=== Llanwenog ===
Llanwenog 1952
Party	Candidate	Votes	%	±%
Independent	Thomas Donald Gwarnant Williams*	Unopposed		
Independent hold		Swing		

=== Lledrod ===
Lledrod 1952
Party	Candidate	Votes	%	±%
Independent	Owen James Owen*	Unopposed		
Independent hold		Swing		

=== Nantcwnlle ===
Nantcwnlle 1952
Party	Candidate	Votes	%	±%
Independent	John Edwardes Rogers Lewis*	Unopposed		
Independent hold		Swing		

=== New Quay ===
New Quay 1952
Party	Candidate	Votes	%	±%
Independent	David Oswald Davies	Unopposed		
Independent hold		Swing		

=== Penbryn ===
Penbryn 1952
Party	Candidate	Votes	%	±%
Independent	Morgan Lloyd Jenkins*	Unopposed		
Independent hold		Swing		

=== Strata Florida ===
Strata Florida 1952
Party	Candidate	Votes	%	±%
Independent	Emrys S. Lloyd*	318		
Independent	Morgan Jones+	211		
Majority		107		
Independent hold		Swing		

=== Taliesin ===
Taliesin 1952
Party	Candidate	Votes	%	±%
Independent	Gwilym Caradog Jones*	Unopposed		
Independent hold		Swing		

=== Talybont ===
Talybont 1952
Party	Candidate	Votes	%	±%
Independent	Isaac Richard Jenkins*	236		
Independent	David Lewis Edwards	234		
Majority		2		
Independent hold		Swing		

=== Trefeurig ===
Trefeurig 1952
Party	Candidate	Votes	%	±%
Independent	Jenkin Davies*	Unopposed		
Independent hold		Swing		

=== Tregaron ===
Tregaron 1952
Party	Candidate	Votes	%	±%
Independent	Rev David Thomas Jones	Unopposed		
Independent hold		Swing		

=== Troedyraur ===
Troedyraur 1952
Party	Candidate	Votes	%	±%
Independent	Hywel Heulyn Roberts	427		
Independent	Edwin Stanley Jones*	324		
Majority		103		
Independent gain from Independent		Swing		

=== Ysbyty Ystwyth ===
Ysbyty Ystwyth 1952
Party	Candidate	Votes	%	±%
Independent	Thomas Cardaog Edwards*	Unopposed		
Independent hold		Swing		

== Election of Aldermen ==
In addition to the 50 councillors the council consisted of 16 county aldermen. Aldermen were elected by the council, and served a six-year term. Following the 1952 election, there were eight aldermanic vacancies which were filled at the annual meeting on 16 April.

The following retiring aldermen was re-elected:

- D.R. Morgan, Bow Street
- Mrs C.M. Evans, Aberystwyth
- John Williams, Goginan
- Josiah R. Jones, Llandysul

In addition, the following four new aldermen were elected:

- Rev E.M. Lewis, Aberporth (also elected vice-chairman of the council)
- Evan Evans, Cilcennin
- Capt. D. Oswald Davies, New Quay
- O.J. Owen, Lledrod

The father of the council, Josiah R. Jones, had served since 1910, while D.R. Morgan had served since 1922 and Evan Evans since 1925.

== Aldermanic Vacancies, 1952-55 ==
Two vacancies arose in early 1955, following the deaths of Alderman Josiah R. Jones, the father of the council, and of Mrs C.M. Lewis Evans, Aberystwyth. Edward Lewis, Llandysul and Mrs Gwendoline Calan Evans, Aberystwyth, were elected to take their place.

== By-elections ==
Seven by-elections were held following the election of aldermen. Josiah R. Jones had been designated a life alderman on account of his long service and was not obliged to seek re-election. At Bow Street and Goginan, retiring councillors who had stood down in favour of retiring aldermen were returned unopposed.

After two nominated candidates withdrew, four contested by-elections were held to fill the vacancies.

=== Aberporth by-election ===
Aberporth by-election 1952
Party	Candidate	Votes	%	±%
Independent	Rev Tegryn Davies	Unopposed		
Independent hold		Swing		

=== Aberystwyth Division 3 by-election ===
Aberystwyth Division 5 by-election 1952
Party	Candidate	Votes	%	±%
Independent	Ryland Kenneth Clues	307		
Independent	Brinley L. Jones	203		
Majority		104		
Independent hold		Swing		

=== Bow Street by-election ===
Bow Street by-election 1952
Party	Candidate	Votes	%	±%
Independent	Bodin Trevor Williams*	Unopposed		
Independent hold		Swing		

=== Cilcennin by-election ===
Cilcennin by-election 1952
Party	Candidate	Votes	%	±%
Independent	William J. Jones	303		
Independent	Isaac E. Jones	265		
Majority		38		
Independent hold		Swing		

=== Goginan by-election ===
Goginan by-election 1952
Party	Candidate	Votes	%	±%
Independent	Isaac Richard Lewis*	Unopposed		
Independent hold		Swing		

=== Lledrod by-election ===
Lledrod by-election 1952
Party	Candidate	Votes	%	±%
Independent	R.O. Williams	249		
Independent	Rev W.J. Davies	243		
Majority		6		
Independent hold		Swing		

=== New Quay by-election ===
New Quay by-election 1952
Party	Candidate	Votes	%	±%
Independent	Rev Victor Thomas	314		
Independent	John Williams	302		
Independent	Walter Cherry	96		
Majority		12		
Independent hold		Swing		
