= Llaingarreglwyd =

Village in Ceredigion, Wales

Coordinates: 52.206282°N 4.321422°W

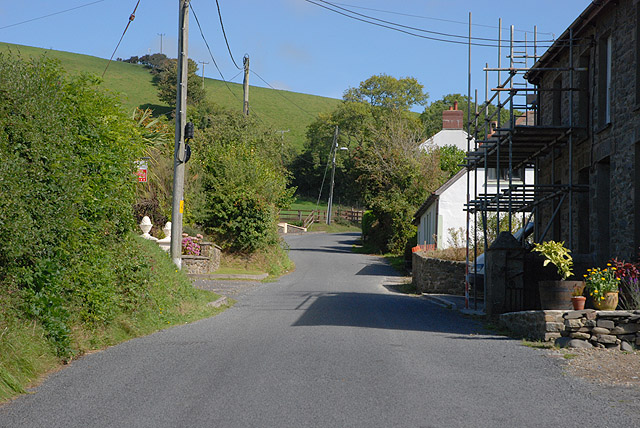
- Road through Llaingarreglwyd

- Location within Ceredigion
- OS grid reference: SN 4147 5899
  - Cardiff: 70 mi (110 km)
  - London: 185.3 mi (298.2 km)
- Community: Llanarth
- Principal area: Ceredigion
- Country: Wales
- Sovereign state: United Kingdom
- Post town: Llanarth
- Postcode district: SA47
- Police: Dyfed-Powys
- Fire: Mid and West Wales
- Ambulance: Welsh
- UK Parliament: Ceredigion Preseli
- Senedd Cymru – Welsh Parliament: Ceredigion

Llaingarreglwyd is a hamlet in the community of Llanarth, Ceredigion, Wales, which is 70 miles (112.6 km) from Cardiff and 185.3 miles (298.1 km) from London. Llaingarreglwyd is represented in the Senedd by Elin Jones (Plaid Cymru) and is part of the Ceredigion Preseli constituency in the House of Commons.

== See also ==
- List of localities in Wales by population
