= Neudd-fawr =

Village in Ceredigion, Wales

Coordinates: 52.110645°N 4.139076°W

- Location within Ceredigion
- OS grid reference: SN 5361 4797
  - Cardiff: 59.9 mi (96.4 km)
  - London: 176.3 mi (283.7 km)
- Community: Llanwnnen
- Principal area: Ceredigion
- Country: Wales
- Sovereign state: United Kingdom
- Post town: Aberaeron
- Postcode district: SA48
- Police: Dyfed-Powys
- Fire: Mid and West Wales
- Ambulance: Welsh
- UK Parliament: Ceredigion Preseli
- Senedd Cymru – Welsh Parliament: Ceredigion

Neudd-fawr (also spelt Neuadd Fawr) is a rural area in the community of Llanwnnen, Ceredigion, Wales, which is 59.9 miles (96.4 km) from Cardiff and 176.3 miles (283.7 km) from London. It is centered around, and named after a local mansion house. Neudd-fawr is represented in the Senedd by Elin Jones (Plaid Cymru) and is part of the Ceredigion Preseli constituency in the House of Commons.

== Etymology ==
The meaning of this Welsh language name is "Great Hall".

== See also ==
- List of localities in Wales by population
