= Rhyd-y-Beillen =

Village in Ceredigion, Wales

Coordinates: 52.167575°N 4.332301°W

Pentre'r Bryn
- Location within Ceredigion
- OS grid reference: SN 4059 5471
  - Cardiff: 68.5 mi (110.2 km)
  - London: 185.1 mi (297.9 km)
- Community: Llanarth
- Principal area: Ceredigion
- Country: Wales
- Sovereign state: United Kingdom
- Post town: Llanarth
- Postcode district: SA44
- Police: Dyfed-Powys
- Fire: Mid and West Wales
- Ambulance: Welsh
- UK Parliament: Ceredigion Preseli
- Senedd Cymru – Welsh Parliament: Ceredigion

Pentre'r Bryn is a hamlet in the community of Llanarth, Ceredigion, Wales, which is 68.5 miles (110.2 km) from Cardiff and 185.1 miles (297.9 km) from London. Pentre'r Bryn is represented in the Senedd by Elin Jones (Plaid Cymru) and is part of the Ceredigion Preseli constituency in the House of Commons.

== See also ==
- List of localities in Wales by population
