= John Evans (died 1779) =

Welsh Anglican priest and curate of Portsmouth

John Evans (died 1779), was curate of Portsmouth.

Evans was born at Meini Gwynion, Llanarth, Cardiganshire, and was educated at Oxford. His first curacy was that of Llanarth, whence he removed to Portsmouth. The author of the ‘Welsh Bibliography’ supposed him to have been the Ioan Evans who translated Dr. Jabez Earle's ‘Meditations on the Sacraments,’ 1735; his ‘Harmony of the Four Gospels’ was published in 1765. This was the first work published in Welsh to expound any portion of the Bible, being fifteen years earlier than that of Peter Williams.

He is supposed to have seen through the press the Welsh bible of 1769 (twenty thousand copies); he translated Bishop Gastrell's ‘Christian Institutes,’ 1773. A second edition of the ‘Harmony’ was published in 1804.
