= Mark Williams (politician) =

Former Leader of the Welsh Liberal Democrats

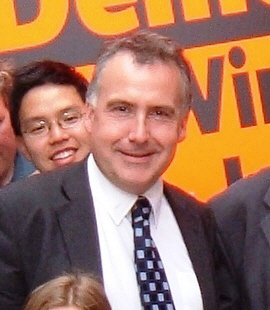
- Williams in 2009

Leader of the Welsh Liberal Democrats
- In office 7 May 2016 – 16 June 2017
- Leader: Tim Farron
- Preceded by: Kirsty Williams
- Succeeded by: Jane Dodds (Note: Kirsty Williams acted from 16 June 2017 to 3 November 2017.)

Liberal Democrat Spokesperson for Wales
- In office 8 May 2016 – 16 June 2017
- Leader: Tim Farron
- Preceded by: Kirsty Williams
- Succeeded by: The Baroness Humphreys

Member of Parliament for Ceredigion
- In office 5 May 2005 – 3 May 2017
- Preceded by: Simon Thomas
- Succeeded by: Ben Lake

Personal details
- Born: Mark Fraser Williams; 24 March 1966 (age 60) Hertfordshire, England
- Party: Liberal Democrats
- Spouse: Helen
- Children: 4
- Education: Aberystwyth University; Plymouth University
- Website: Official website

Mark Fraser Williams (born 24 March 1966) is a British politician who served as leader of the Welsh Liberal Democrats from 2016 to 2017. He was the Member of Parliament (MP) for the Ceredigion constituency, between 2005 and 2017. He sat on the Welsh Affairs Select Committee, and in 2006 he became a Shadow Minister for Wales under Menzies Campbell.

Williams is a graduate of the University of Wales, Aberystwyth and the University of Plymouth, and is now deputy head of a school in Llangorse near Brecon.

== Early life ==
Mark Williams was born in Hertfordshire on 24 March 1966. His mother worked as a classroom assistant, and his father ran a printing business; he has two older sisters. He attended the local village primary school and then Richard Hale Secondary School, Hertford, from where he moved on to the University of Wales, Aberystwyth in 1984 to study politics. It was at school during the days of the SDP-Liberal Alliance that he become involved in Liberal politics, later saying:

"I instinctively knew I wasn’t a Conservative, despite coming from a formally conservative family and the Labour Party was in perpetual decline."

== Political career ==
Within a week of arriving in Aberystwyth, Williams became secretary of the student group and met local Liberal MP Geraint Howells. After graduating, he became a part-time researcher to the Liberal peers in the House of Lords, but was determined to stay in Ceredigion and spent half the week and all of the Parliamentary holidays as assistant to Howells in Ceredigion, until he lost the seat at the 1992 general election.

Williams then returned to student life at the teacher training college in Exmouth, part of the University of Plymouth. After securing this qualification, he taught in primary schools in Penzance and Barnstaple, before becoming a deputy headteacher in Llangors School, Powys in 2000. During this period, Williams fought Monmouth at the 1997 general election, finishing third.

In February 2000, after a spell as President of Ceredigion Liberal Democrats, Williams was selected to fight the Ceredigion seat in the by-election caused by the resignation of Cynog Dafis. In that by-election, the Liberal Democrats rose back into second place, and in the general election of 2001 consolidated that by coming second, being just 3,944 votes behind Plaid Cymru. In May 2005, 13 years after Howells had been defeated, the Liberal Democrats regained Ceredigion, with Williams as their candidate, by a very narrow majority of 219 votes. Williams described his victory as an "amazing result", while the then Welsh Liberal Democrat leader, Lembit Öpik, said that "Mark Williams has pulled off the result of the night in Ceredigion". Williams was the first non-Welsh-speaking Member of Parliament to represent the constituency since the widening of the electoral franchise in 1867. In 2010, he substantially increased his majority, winning just over 50% of the vote; this was the first time any candidate had won more than 50% of the vote in Ceredigion since 1959.

Williams sat on the Welsh Affairs Select Committee between 2005 and 2017, and held various shadow ministerial roles in the 2005–2010 Parliament. He called for Saint David's Day to be made a public holiday in Wales. He proposed a private member's bill with the backing of a leading charity to update child protection legislation. It would amend the Children and Young Persons Act 1933, because this only covers physical harm, and not psychological neglect. The bill is backed by Action for Children.

Williams was defeated in the 2017 general election by Ben Lake of Plaid Cymru, whose majority of 104 made the seat one of the most marginal in the country. The result left the Liberal Democrat Party without an MP in Wales, a situation which had not existed since the founding of the Liberal Party in 1859. He resigned as leader of the Welsh Liberal Democrats shortly after his defeat.

Williams unsuccessfully re-contested Ceredigion in the 2019 general election, falling to third place behind Plaid Cymru and the Conservatives. Following this, he paid tribute to Lake, and then subsequently announced that he would not stand for parliament again.

In December 2022 Williams was among 32 individuals and entities banned from entering Iran by the Iranian Ministry of Foreign Affairs for views which the Iranian regime claim “promote terrorism and violence”. Responding to this Williams said: “I have always been steadfast in my support for a free and democratic Iran...The campaign for justice in Iran will go on regardless of any sanctions by the Iranian regime."

In May 2023, he was reselected to stand in Ceredigion Preseli at the 2024 general election. He lost the election by coming in second place.

== Electoral history ==
Westminster Parliament elections

Date of election	Constituency	Party	Votes	% of votes	Result
1997 election	Monmouth	Liberal Democrats	4,689	9.6	Not elected
February 2000 by-election	Ceredigion	Liberal Democrats	5,768	23.0	Not elected
2001 election	Ceredigion	Liberal Democrats	9,297	26.9	Not elected
2005 election	Ceredigion	Liberal Democrats	13,130	36.5	Elected
2010 election	Ceredigion	Liberal Democrats	19,139	50.0	Elected
2015 election	Ceredigion	Liberal Democrats	13,414	35.9	Elected
2017 election	Ceredigion	Liberal Democrats	11,519	29.0	Defeated
2019 election	Ceredigion	Liberal Democrats	6,975	17.4	Not elected
2024 election	Ceredigion Preseli	Liberal Democrats	6,949	15.0	Not elected

== Family life ==
Mark Williams and his wife Helen have four children, Eleanor, Anna, and twins Eliza and Oliver.

Parliament of the United Kingdom
Preceded by Simon Thomas	Member of Parliament for Ceredigion; 2005–2017	Succeeded by Ben Lake
Party political offices
Preceded by Kirsty Williams	Leader of the Welsh Liberal Democrats; 2016–2017	Succeeded by Kirsty Williams
