= 2000 Ceredigion by-election =

2000 UK Parliament by-election in Wales

- 3 February 2000

Ceredigion constituency
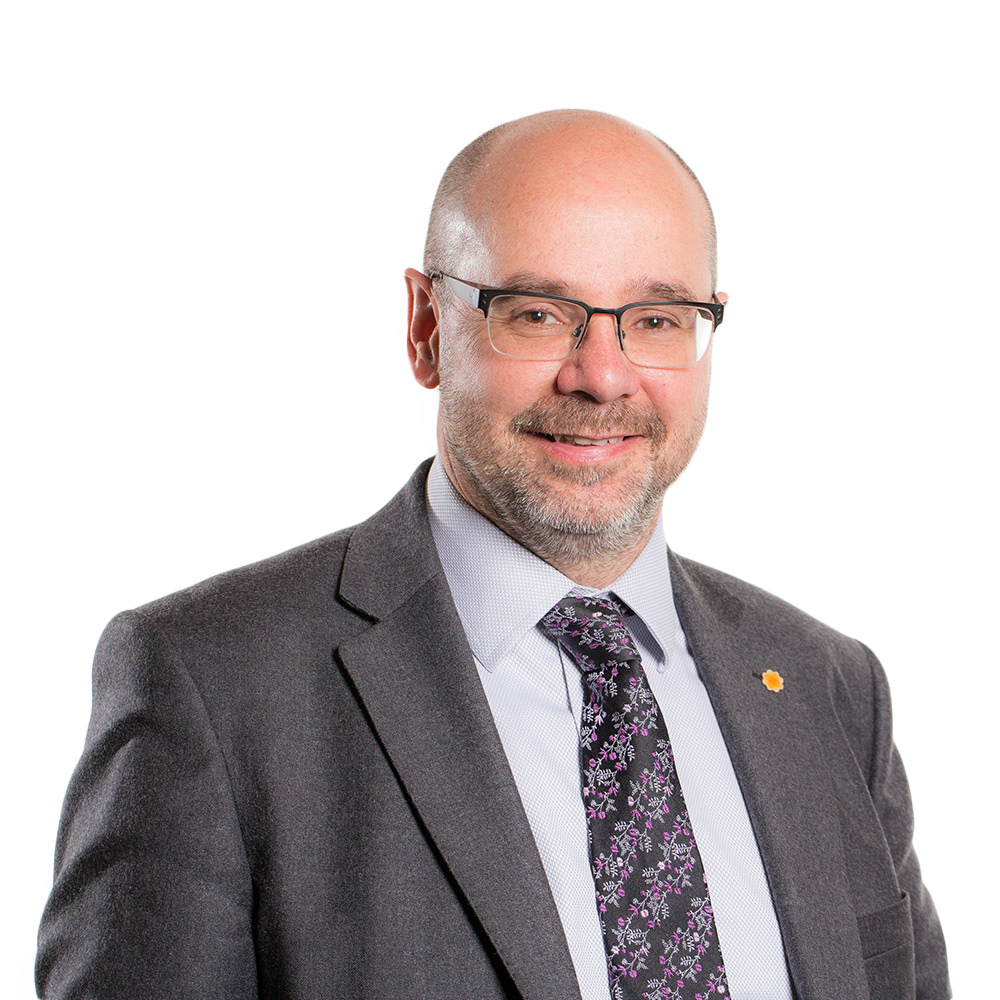

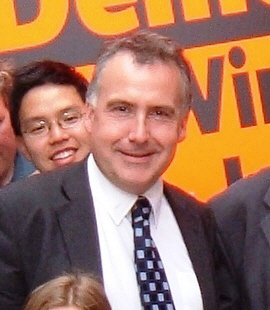

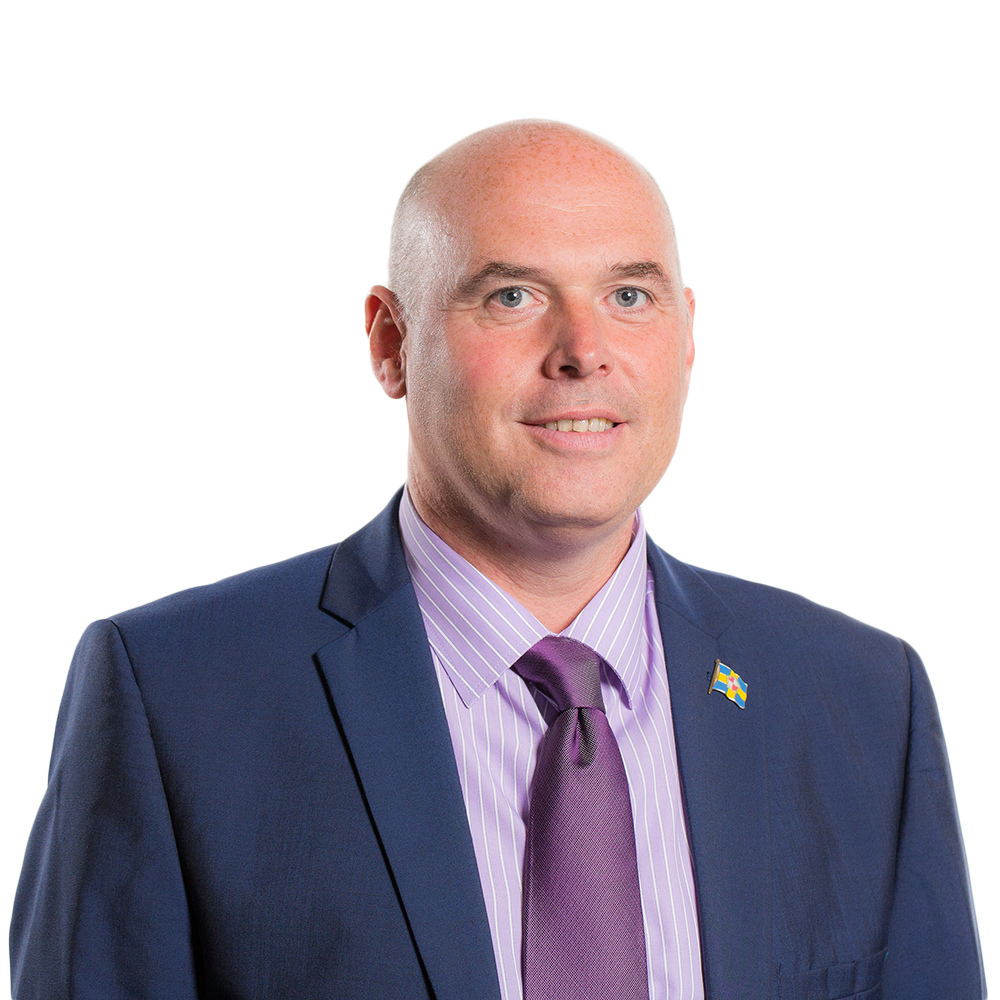
	First party	Second party
Candidate	Simon Thomas	Mark Williams
Party	Plaid Cymru	Liberal Democrats
Popular vote	10,716	5,768
Percentage	42.8%	23.0%
Swing	▲1.1%	▲6.5%
	Third party	Fourth party
		Lab
Candidate	Paul Davies	Maria Battle
Party	Conservative	Labour
Popular vote	4,138	3,612
Percentage	16.5%	14.4%
Swing	▲1.6%	▼9.9%
MP before election
Cynog Dafis
Plaid Cymru
Subsequent MP
Simon Thomas
Plaid Cymru

A by-election for the United Kingdom parliamentary constituency of Ceredigion was held on 3 February 2000, following the resignation of incumbent Plaid Cymru Member of Parliament Cynog Dafis; he decided to give up his seat after unexpectedly being elected to the National Assembly for Wales in May 1999. Plaid Cymru's Simon Thomas won the by-election, comfortably holding the seat for the party.

Dafis formally vacated his seat on 10 January 2000 by accepting the office of Crown Steward and Bailiff of the Manor of Northstead. Plaid Cymru selected Simon Thomas, who had been their Director of Policy and responsible for writing their manifestos for the 1997 general election and 1999 Assembly election. Labour, who had come second in the previous general election, chose a local social worker, Maria Battle.

The election campaign was dominated by the issue of European Objective 1 funding. The constituency was part of the area of Wales that was granted Objective One status in 1999, but under European rules the funding had to be matched by a minimum of 25% from other sources, including private funding and resources from central and local government. Plaid Cymru, Conservative and Liberal Democrat politicians demanded this funding be made available solely from central government in addition to the block grant already paid to the Welsh Assembly by the UK Treasury, and the chief reporter for Wales on Sunday newspaper Martin Shipton stood as a single-issue candidate demanding 'Match Funding now'. The Labour administration in the Welsh Assembly insisted that such a demand misrepresented the resourcing of Objective 1 programmes.

== Electoral history ==
General election 1997: Ceredigion
Party	Candidate	Votes	%	±%
Plaid Cymru	Cynog Dafis	16,728	41.6	+10.7
Labour	Robert (Hag) Harris	9,767	24.3	+5.7
Liberal Democrats	Dai Davies	6,616	16.5	−10.0
Conservative	Felix Aubel	5,983	14.9	−9.1
Referendum	John Leaney	1,092	2.7	New
Majority		6,961	17.3	+4.9
Turnout		40,186	73.9	−4.1
Registered electors		54,378		
Plaid Cymru hold		Swing	+2.5	

== Result ==
2000 Ceredigion by-election
Party	Candidate	Votes	%	±%
Plaid Cymru	Simon Thomas	10,716	42.8	+1.1
Liberal Democrats	Mark Williams	5,768	23.0	+6.5
Conservative	Paul Davies	4,138	16.5	+1.6
Labour	Maria Battle	3,612	14.4	−9.9
UKIP	John Bufton	487	1.9	New
Independent Green – Save the World Climate	John Davies	289	1.2	New
Wales on Sunday – Match Funding Now	Martin Shipton	55	0.2	New
Majority		4,948	19.8	+2.5
Turnout		25,143	46.0	−27.9
Registered electors		55,025		
Plaid Cymru hold		Swing	-2.7	
