= Ben Lake =

Welsh politician (born 1993)

Ben Lake MP
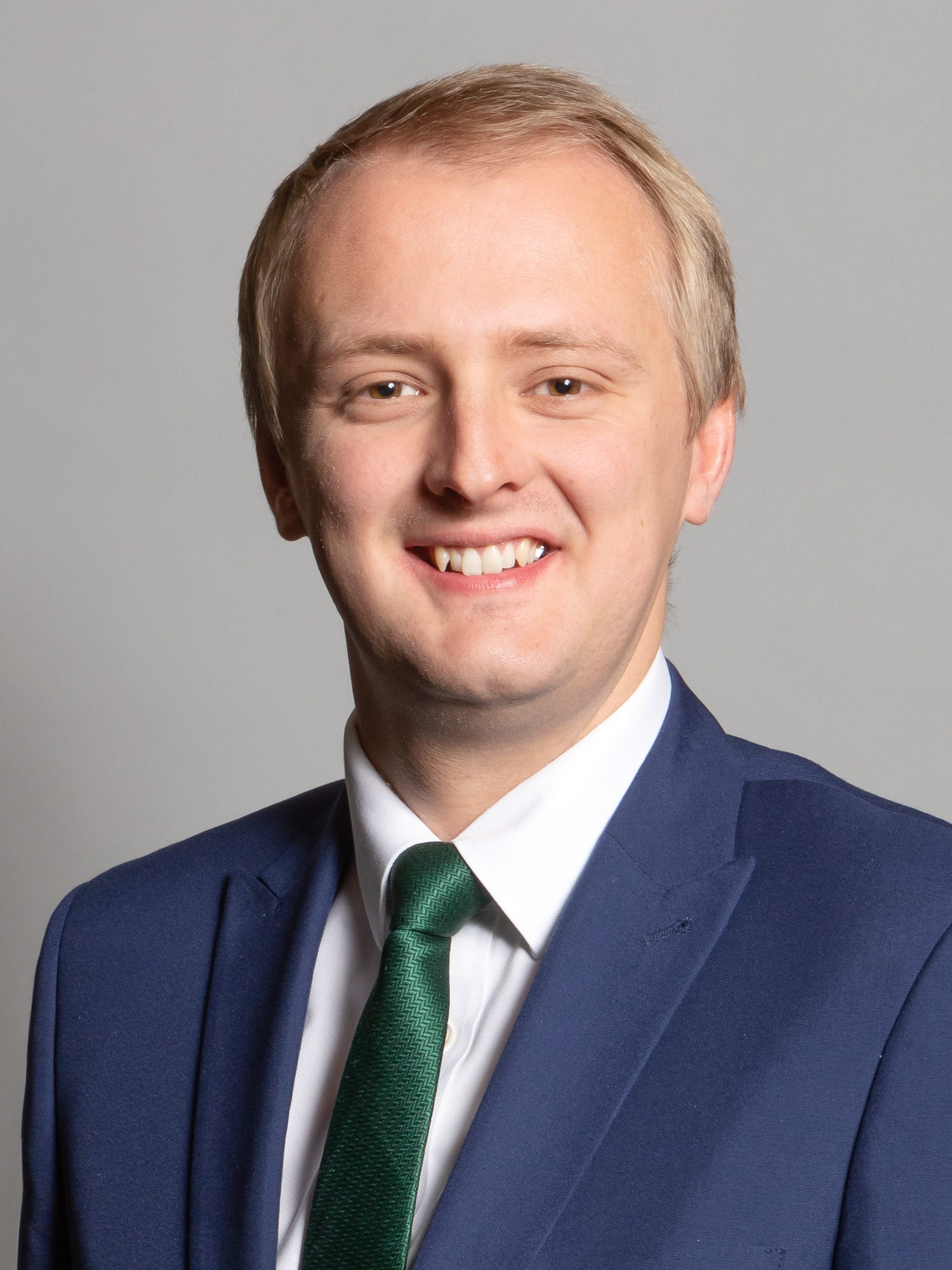
- Official portrait, 2020

Member of Parliament for Ceredigion Preseli Ceredigion (2017–2024)
- Incumbent
- Assumed office 8 June 2017
- Preceded by: Mark Williams
- Majority: 14,789 (31.9%)

Personal details
- Born: Ben Morgan Lake; 22 January 1993 (age 33) Carmarthen, Wales
- Party: Plaid Cymru
- Education: Trinity College, Oxford

Ben Morgan Lake (born 22 January 1993) is a Plaid Cymru politician who became the Member of Parliament (MP) for Ceredigion Preseli, formerly Ceredigion, in 2017.

== Background ==
Lake was born in Carmarthen and brought up in Lampeter. He is the son of a police officer and a council worker. He attended Ffynnonbedr Primary School and Ysgol Bro Pedr. After graduating from Trinity College, Oxford, with an undergraduate degree in History and Politics, and a master's degree in Modern British and European History, he became a research officer in the National Assembly for Wales. His first language is Welsh, which was seen as a key factor in his election as MP for one of the strongest Welsh-speaking constituencies in Wales.

== Political career ==
In the 2017 general election, Lake won the Ceredigion constituency, gaining the seat from Liberal Democrat Mark Williams with 11,623 votes (29.2% of the overall vote). In the 2019 general election, Lake retained his seat with 15,208 votes (37.9% of the overall vote). In the 2024 general election, Lake won the new Ceredigion Preseli constituency with 21,738 votes (46.9%).

Lake was appointed the Plaid Cymru spokesperson at Westminster for the Environment, Food & Rural Affairs, Education & Skills, Health, Communities & Local Government, Culture, Media & Sport and Constitutional Affairs shortly after his election in 2017. Since the 2024 General Election, Lake has served as his party's spokesperson for the Foreign, Commonwealth and Development Office, Science, Innovation, and Technology, and the Treasury.

Lake was appointed a member of the Welsh Affairs Committee in September 2017, and remains a member having been reappointed to the committee following both the 2019 and 2024 General Elections. Lake also served as a member of the Public Accounts Committee from June 2023 until the 2024 General Election.

He is a member of the All-Party Parliamentary Group on State Pension Inequality for Women. He supported Rhun ap Iorwerth in the 2018 Plaid Cymru leadership election.

In December 2017, Lake was awarded the 'Politician to Watch' prize as part of the ITV Welsh Politician of the Year Awards 2017. In August 2019, Lake was awarded the MP of the Year Award, acknowledging MPs who actively work with under-represented and disadvantaged communities across the UK.2019 results

Lake is Chair of the All-Party Parliamentary Group on Forestry and Tree Planting, the All-Party Parliamentary Group on Western Sahara, and the All-Party Parliamentary Group on France.

Parliament of the United Kingdom
Preceded by Mark Williams	Member of Parliament for Ceredigion; 2017–present	Incumbent
