= Simon Thomas (politician) =

British politician & former librarian (born 1963)

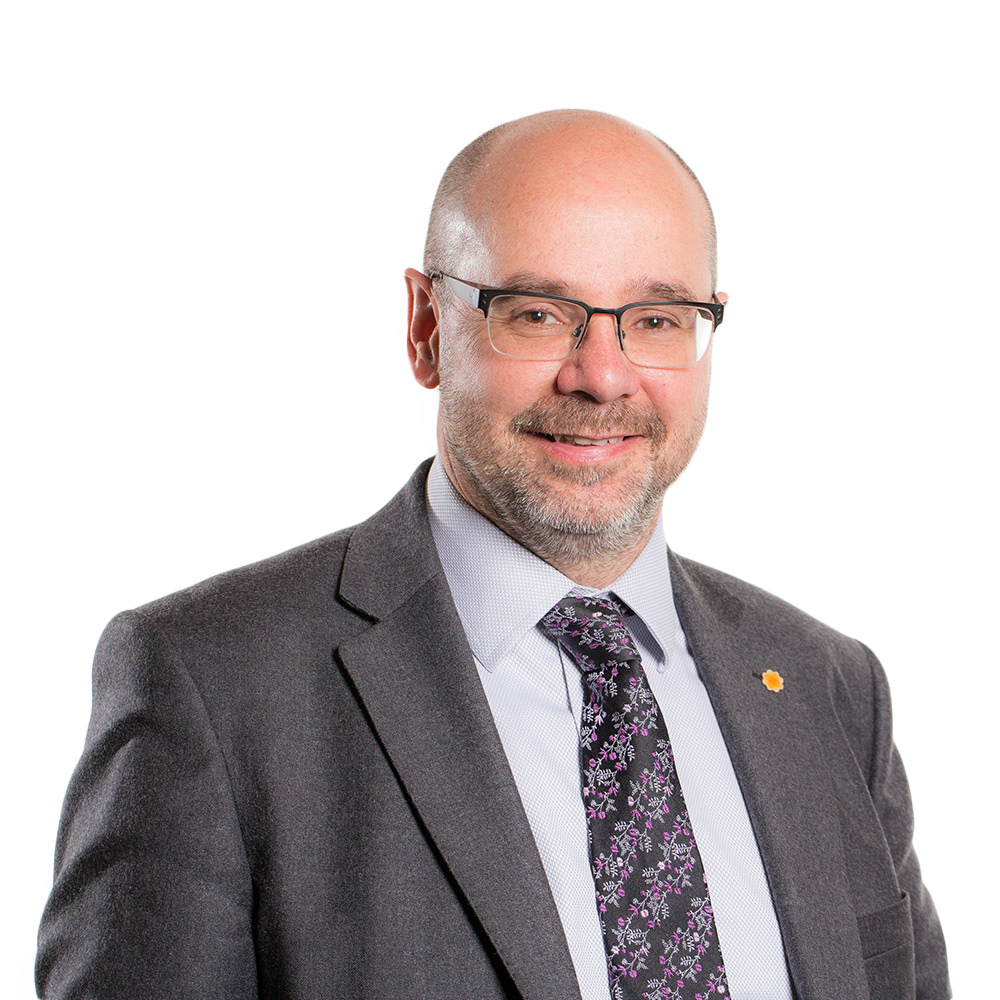
- Thomas in 2016

Member of the Welsh Assembly for Mid and West Wales
- In office 6 May 2011 – 25 July 2018
- Preceded by: Nerys Evans
- Succeeded by: Helen Mary Jones

Member of Parliament for Ceredigion
- In office 3 February 2000 – 11 April 2005
- Preceded by: Cynog Dafis
- Succeeded by: Mark Williams

Personal details
- Born: Simon George Thomas; 28 December 1963 (age 62)
- Party: Plaid Cymru (until 2018); None (2018-)

Simon George Thomas (born 28 December 1963) is a Welsh former politician who was a member of Plaid Cymru. He was a Member of Parliament (MP) for Ceredigion from 2000 to 2005, and an Assembly Member in the National Assembly for Wales representing the Mid and West Wales list between 2011 and 2018.

Thomas resigned as an Assembly Member and his party membership on 25 July 2018, following arrest by police on suspicion of possession of indecent images. On 3 October 2018, he pleaded guilty to three counts of making indecent images of children. On 31 October 2018 he was given a 26-week jail sentence, suspended for two years.

== Early life ==
He went to Aberdare Boys' Grammar School (became Aberdare Boys' Comprehensive School in 1978). At the University of College Wales, Aberystwyth, he gained a BA in Welsh and Education in 1985. He gained a Postgraduate diploma (DipLib) from the College of Librarianship Wales (CLW) in Llanbadarn Fawr, Aberystwyth in 1988 (College became part of the university in 1989).

He was assistant curator for the National Library of Wales from 1986 to 1992. From 1992 to 1994, he was a political advisor for the Plaid-run Taff-Ely borough council. From 1994 to 2000, he was Rural Development Manager for the JIGSO rural development agency.

Thomas is the father of two children. At the time of his trial, he lived in Penparcau, a village south of Aberystwyth. Locals have raised concern that he lives on the same street as a primary school.

== Political career ==
Thomas was elected as a Councillor in Ceredigion County Council for Aberystwyth East in 1999 and resigned after being elected a Member of Parliament. He was fifth on Plaid Cymru's regional list for Mid and West Wales in the inaugural National Assembly for Wales election in 1999; only list leader Cynog Dafis was elected.

Thomas was first elected as MP for Ceredigion in the 2000 by-election after Dafis stepped down to focus on his role as an Assembly member. On entering the House of Commons, he took the oath of allegiance in the Welsh language, and was heckled by some English MPs. He retained the seat for Plaid Cymru at the 2001 election with a reduced majority, and lost it in the 2005 general election to Mark Williams of the Liberal Democrats. During the 2005 general election he wrote a blog on the Channel 4 News website which shows a near daily account of his campaign trail and his thoughts following his defeat. Thomas said he had not expected his defeat. According to a BBC news report he said "I was getting a very positive response on the doorstep". In the aftermath of his defeat, he called for Plaid Cymru to reform its leadership arrangements and have a single leader "round which the party coalesces and around which the people of Wales can identify".

Ahead of the 2007 election he sought a place on Plaid Cymru's South Wales Central list. After being placed 4th by his party and facing no realistic chance of being elected he withdrew and did not stand. Following the 2007 Welsh Assembly election, he was appointed a special adviser to the Plaid Cymru ministers in the Welsh Assembly Government coalition between his party and Labour.

In September 2010, Simon Thomas was placed at the top of Plaid Cymru's regional list for Mid and West Wales in the 2011 Welsh Assembly election with the incumbent Nerys Evans instead running for the constituency seat of Carmarthen West and South Pembrokeshire. He was elected to the National Assembly for Wales.

When a party leadership election was triggered by the resignation of Ieuan Wyn Jones, Thomas announced his candidacy on 1 December 2011. The following 6 February, he withdrew in favour of Elin Jones, running to become her deputy leader. The election was won by Leanne Wood.

Ahead of the 2016 Assembly Election, unsuccessfully sought the Plaid Cymru nomination for Llanelli, but lost out to Helen Mary Jones, he went on to stand in the constituency of Carmarthen West and South Pembrokeshire, coming third as Angela Burns retained it for the Conservatives, he was however returned on the Mid and West Wales List.

Following the 2016 election he was elected unopposed as chair of the Assembly's Finance Committee, a position he held until July 2018.

== United Kingdom parliamentary expenses scandal ==
As part of the investigation into United Kingdom parliamentary expenses scandal, Thomas was found to have over claimed £349.20 in mortgage interest between 2004 and 2005 under the additional costs allowance (ACA). He was recommended to repay this sum, by 1 April 2009 no money was repaid.

== Arrest and resignation ==
On 25 July 2018 he resigned as an AM and from Plaid Cymru following his arrest by police on suspicion of possession of indecent images. His seat was taken by Helen Mary Jones, who was next in line on Plaid's regional list.

On 18 September he was charged by Dyfed-Powys Police with three counts of making indecent images of children. In the context of digital media, saving an indecent image to a computer's hard drive is considered to be "making" the image, as it causes a copy to exist which did not exist before.

He pleaded guilty to three counts of making indecent images at Aberystwyth Magistrates' Court on 3 October 2018, having made over 600 such images and videos. On 31 October 2018 he was given a 26-week jail sentence, suspended for two years by Mold Magistrates Courts and ordered to remain on the sex offenders register for seven years.

== Electoral performance ==
Thomas contested several elections under the Plaid Cymru banner:

National Assembly Regional Seats

Date of election	Constituency	Party	Votes	% of votes	Result
1999 Welsh Assembly election	Mid and West Wales	Plaid Cymru	84,554	38.5	Not elected
2011 Welsh Assembly election	Mid and West Wales	Plaid Cymru	56,384	26.7	Elected
2016 Welsh Assembly election	Mid and West Wales	Plaid Cymru	56,754	26.3	Elected

National Assembly Constituency Seats

Date of election	Constituency	Party	Votes	% of votes	Result
2016 Welsh Assembly election	Carmarthen West and South Pembrokeshire	Plaid Cymru	5,459	18.7	Not elected

Westminster Parliament elections

Date of election	Constituency	Party	Votes	% of votes	Result
by-election in February 2000	Ceredigion	Plaid Cymru	10,716	42.8	Elected
2001 election	Ceredigion	Plaid Cymru	13,241	38.3	Elected
2005 election	Ceredigion	Plaid Cymru	12,911	35.9	Defeated

Parliament of the United Kingdom
Preceded by Cynog Dafis	Member of Parliament for Ceredigion; 2000–2005	Succeeded by Mark Williams
Senedd
Preceded by Nerys Evans	Assembly Member for Mid and West Wales; 2011–2018	Succeeded by Helen Mary Jones
Political offices
Preceded by	Shadow Minister for Sustainable Communities, Energy and Rural Affairs; 2016 – 2018	Succeeded by TBD
