= Ceredigion and Pembroke North =

UK Parliament constituency (1983–1997)

- Former county constituency for the House of Commons
- Preserved county: Dyfed

1983–1997
- Seats: One
- Created from: Cardigan and Pembrokeshire
- Replaced by: Ceredigion and Preseli Pembrokeshire

Ceredigion and Pembroke North was a county constituency in southwestern Wales which elected one MP via the first past the post electoral system. It was located in the preserved county of Dyfed.

== Boundaries ==
The constituency had the same boundaries for its entire lifetime, and consisted of Ceredigion and an area of northern Pembrokeshire around the towns of Newport and Fishguard. It was created in 1983, and abolished again at the next review of electoral boundaries in 1997.

Under proposed changes announced in September 2016, the constituency would have been recreated with a somewhat larger area, and also including a small area of western Montgomeryshire.

== Electoral history ==
The Liberals' Geraint Howells was the seat's first MP, having also held the predecessor Cardigan seat for 9 years. He was elected in both 1983 and 1987 with a comparatively low vote share compared to most other constituencies. In 1992, however, Plaid Cymru jumped from fourth to first place in one of that election's biggest upsets. Cynog Dafis was its MP thereafter, and then transferred to Ceredigion after the seat's abolition.

The area was considered to be a swing seat between Plaid Cymru and the Liberal Democrats.

== Members of Parliament ==
Election	Member	Party
1983	Geraint Howells	Liberal
1988	Geraint Howells	Liberal Democrats
1992	Cynog Dafis	Plaid Cymru

== Elections ==
=== Elections in the 1980s ===
General election 1983: Ceredigion and Pembroke North
Party	Candidate	Votes	%	±%
Liberal	Geraint Howells	19,677	41.8	+6.2
Conservative	William Raw-Rees	14,038	29.8	+0.1
Labour	Griffith Hughes	6,840	14.5	―5.7
Plaid Cymru	Cynog Dafis	6,072	12.9	―1.6
Ecology	Marylin Smith	431	0.9	New
Majority		5,639	12.0	+6.1
Turnout		47,058	77.8	
Registered electors		60,523		
Liberal win (new seat)				

General election 1987: Ceredigion and Pembroke North
Party	Candidate	Votes	%	±%
Liberal	Geraint Howells	17,683	36.6	―5.2
Conservative	Owen Williams	12,983	26.9	―2.9
Labour	John Davies	8,965	18.6	+4.1
Plaid Cymru	Cynog Dafis	7,848	16.2	+3.3
Green	Marylin Wakefield	821	1.7	+0.8
Majority		4,700	9.7	―2.3
Turnout		48,300	76.5	―1.3
Registered electors		63,141		
Liberal hold		Swing	–1.7	

=== Elections in the 1990s ===
General election 1992: Ceredigion and Pembroke North
Party	Candidate	Votes	%	±%
Plaid Cymru (Green)	Cynog Dafis	16,020	31.3	+15.1
Liberal Democrats	Geraint Howells	12,827	25.1	―11.5
Conservative	Owen Williams	12,718	24.8	―2.1
Labour	John Davies	9,637	18.8	+0.2
Majority		3,193	6.2	N/A
Turnout		51,202	77.4	+0.9
Registered electors		66,180		
Plaid Cymru - Green gain from Liberal Democrats		Swing	+13.3	

== See also ==
- Ceredigion (Assembly constituency)
- List of parliamentary constituencies in Dyfed
- List of parliamentary constituencies in Wales
