= Geraint Howells =

Welsh politician (1925–2004)

The Right Honourable The Lord Geraint
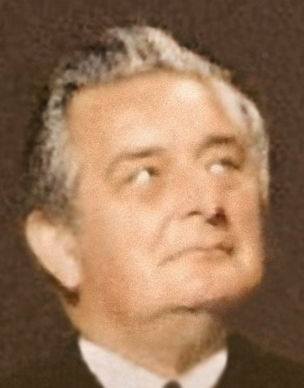

Member of Parliament for Ceredigion and Pembroke North Cardigan (1974–1983)
- In office 28 February 1974 – 16 March 1992
- Preceded by: Elystan Morgan
- Succeeded by: Cynog Dafis

Member of the House of Lords
- Lord Temporal
- Life peerage 18 July 1992 – 17 April 2004

Personal details
- Born: Geraint Wyn Howells; 15 April 1925 Ponterwyd, Wales
- Died: 17 April 2004 (aged 79) Aberystwyth, Wales
- Party: Liberal (before 1988); Liberal Democrats (after 1988)
- Spouse: Mary Olwen Griffiths (m. 1957)
- Children: 2
- Profession: Farmer

Geraint Wyn Howells, Baron Geraint (15 April 1925 – 17 April 2004) was a Welsh politician of the Liberal Party and its successor, the Liberal Democrats. He was the Member of Parliament (MP) for Cardigan from 1974 to 1983 and Ceredigion and Pembroke North from 1983 to 1992.

== Early life and education ==
Howells was born in Ponterwyd, Cardiganshire, in 1925. He was the son of David John and Mary Blodwen Howells, both farmers. He was educated at Ponterwyd Primary School and Ardwyn Grammar School, Aberystwyth.

== Pre-parliamentary career ==
Howells' main living was as a hill farmer in Glennydd, Ponterwyd in Ceredgion. He held some 750 acres there with around 3,000 sheep. The majority were prize winning Speckled Faces. Howells was also a champion sheep shearer. He held senior positions in the British Wool Marketing Board and was also chairman of the Wool Producers of Wales, 1977–1983. Politically, Howells was elected to Cardiganshire County Council as an Independent in 1952, defeating the sitting member by twelve votes. At this time it was normal practice in Welsh rural counties for Liberal members to stand as independents.

However, in 1958 he was briefly appointed as agent for the prospective Labour candidate for Cardiganshire, Loti Rees Hughes.

== Parliamentary career ==
Howells was selected as the parliamentary candidate for Brecon and Radnor in 1968. He was the first Liberal to contest the seat in the post-war period. He came third with 18.9 per cent of the vote. During this period Howells became one of the central players in the Welsh Liberal Party.

In 1972 Howells was selected as the parliamentary candidate for Cardiganshire, a seat with a longstanding Liberal tradition. It had been held by the Liberal MP, Roderic Bowen, until his defeat by Labour's Elystan Morgan in 1966. In the February 1974 general election Howells defeated Morgan and retained the constituency in several different forms until 1992. Thus he was Member of Parliament (MP) for Cardigan (1974–1983) and Ceredigion and Pembroke North (1983–1992) after boundary changes. Howells was the Liberal Party's spokesman on Welsh Affairs (1979–1987) and agriculture (1987–92). His Westminster secretary and agent was Judi Lewis (Welsh Liberal Democrat chief executive 1992–1997) whilst one of his researchers was Mark Williams who would later win the seat for the Liberal Democrats in 2005.

In 1992, Howells unexpectedly lost his seat to Plaid Cymru (which moved from fourth place to first). Plaid Cymru had formed an alliance with the Wales Green Party which attracted considerable support from non-Welsh speakers in the constituency. Howells was made a life peer as Baron Geraint, of Ponterwyd in the County of Dyfed. Howells was a close friend of both Richard Livsey and Emlyn Hooson, both of whom he served with at Westminster in the House of Commons and the House of Lords.

Howells was passionately pro-devolution. He played a lead role in the 1979 devolution campaign in Wales. He was also able to get the Farmers Union of Wales (FUW) recognition as one of the official unions for government negotiations during the Lib-Lab pact on the 1970s.

== Personal life ==
Geraint Howells married Mary Olwen Griffiths on 7 September 1957. They had two children: Gaenor, a newsreader with the BBC World Service, born in 1961 and Mari born in 1965.

Howells died in Aberystwyth on 17 April 2004, two days after his 79th birthday.

== Bibliography ==
- Leigh Rayment's Historical List of MPs
- Brack, Duncan, ed Dictionary of Liberal Biography, 1998

== Sources ==
- Jones, J. Graham (1994). "The Cardiganshire Election of 1959" (PDF). Ceredigion. 12 (2): 94–105.

Parliament of the United Kingdom
Preceded by Elystan Morgan	Member of Parliament for Cardigan; February 1974 – 1983	Succeeded by constituency renamed
Preceded by constituency renamed	Member of Parliament for Ceredigion and Pembroke North; 1983–1992	Succeeded by Cynog Dafis
Party political offices
Preceded by Martin Thomas	Chairman of the Welsh Liberal Party; 1973–1974	Succeeded by ?
Preceded by Rhys Lloyd	President of the Welsh Liberal Party; 1974–1977	Succeeded by Martin Thomas
Preceded by Emlyn Hooson	Leader of the Welsh Liberal Party; 1979–1988	Succeeded by Richard Livsey; Leader of the Welsh Liberal Democrats
