= Cynog Dafis =

Welsh Plaid Cymru politician

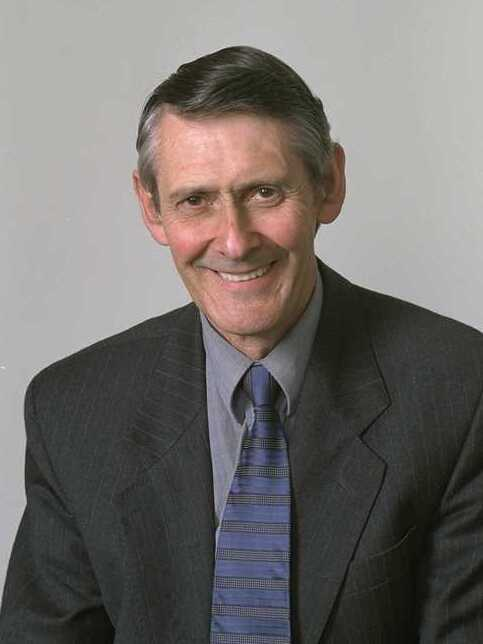
- Official portrait, 1999

Member of the Welsh Assembly for Mid and West Wales
- In office 6 May 1999 – 1 May 2003
- Preceded by: Constituency Created
- Succeeded by: Helen Mary Jones

Member of Parliament for Ceredigion Ceredigion and North Pembrokeshire (1992–1997)
- In office 9 April 1992 – 10 January 2000
- Preceded by: Geraint Howells
- Succeeded by: Simon Thomas

Personal details
- Born: Cynog Glyndwr Davies; 1 April 1938 (age 88) Treboeth, Swansea, Glamorganshire, Wales
- Party: Plaid Cymru
- Other political affiliations: Green Party of England and Wales (1992–1997)
- Spouse: Llinos Iorwerth Jones
- Children: 3
- Education: University of Wales, Aberystwyth

Cynog Glyndwr Dafis (born 1 April 1938) is a Welsh politician and member of Plaid Cymru who served as the Member of Parliament for Ceredigion from 1992 to 2000, originally as a joint Plaid Cymru–Green Party MP until 1997 and then only as a Plaid Cymru MP until 2000. He also served as the Member of the Welsh Assembly for Mid and West Wales from 1999 to 2003. Born Cynog Glyndwr Davies at Treboeth in Swansea, Glamorganshire, Wales, he was initially a school teacher and researcher before entering politics.

== Early life and teaching career ==
Cynog Glyndwr Davies was born in Treboeth, Swansea, on 1 April 1938. His father was George Davies, a Presbyterian minister. He grew up in South Wales and attended Aberaeron Primary School, Aberaeron County Secondary School and Neath Boys' Grammar School. He completed his secondary education in 1956, leaving grammar school with three A-levels in English, Welsh and history.

Davies then trained to become a teacher at University College Wales, Aberystwyth (now Aberystwyth University), where he graduated with a Bachelor of Arts (BA Hons) and Master's in education. After his studies, Davies took to a career of teaching in secondary schools and institutions of further education. He taught Welsh and English at Pontardawe College of Further Education from 1960 to 1962, and also taught English at Newcastle Emlyn Secondary Modern School from 1962 to 1980, Aberaeron Comprehensive School from 1980 to 1984 and Dyffryn Teifi Comprehensive School from 1984 to 1991. From 1991 to 1992, he was also a research officer in the Department of Adult Continuing Education at University College Swansea (now Swansea University).

Davies married Llinos Iorwerth on 1 January 1962. Together, they have two sons and one daughter. The couple lived together at Crugyreryr Uchaf in Talgarreg, Ceredigion for 38 years but have since moved elsewhere. At some point, Davies changed the spelling of his surname from its English form to the Welsh form after his wife had done so to her own name; his name became Cynog Glyndwr Dafis.

== Political career ==
=== Member of Parliament ===
Dafis joined Plaid Cymru in his youth. He left the party in 1964 but rejoined in 1979. He first contested Ceredigion and Pembroke North in 1983 and finished in fourth place, a result repeated in 1987. His victory in 1992 was a notable one as he more than doubled his vote.

Dafis was a Member of Parliament for Ceredigion from 1992 until 2000, having been supported by a coalition of local Plaid Cymru and Green Party activists, the latter of which had worked with him on a number of environmental initiatives. Between 1992 and 1997 Dafis sat in Parliament as an official Plaid Cymru and Green Party MP, having been elected on a joint ticket. He agrees with the Greens' official recognition of Caroline Lucas as the first Green MP, as he was "a kind of hybrid, so I don't really count".

During this eight-year period as an MP, Dafis voted for homosexual law reform, against greater autonomy for schools, and for removing hereditary peers from the House of Lords.

=== Assembly Member ===
In 2000 he resigned as an MP to devote more time as a member of the National Assembly for Wales, to which he had been elected in 1999.

In a speech at the 2000 National Eisteddfod at Llanelli, Dafis called for a new Welsh language movement with greater powers to lobby for the Welsh language at the Assembly, UK, and EU levels. Dafis felt the needs of the language were ignored during the first year of the Assembly, and that in order to ensure a dynamic growth of the Welsh language a properly resourced strategy was needed. In his speech Dafis encouraged other Welsh language advocacy groups to work closer together creating a more favourable climate in which using Welsh was "attractive, exciting, a source of pride and a sign of strength". Dafis pointed towards efforts in areas such as Catalonia and the Basque country as successful examples to emulate.

Lord Elis-Thomas, former Plaid Cymru president, disagreed with Dafis' assessment, however. At the Urdd Eisteddfod, Lord Elis-Thomas said that there was no need for another Welsh language act, claiming that there was "enough goodwill to safeguard the language's future". His controversial comments prompted Cymdeithas yr Iaith Gymraeg to join a chorus calling for his resignation as the Assembly's presiding officer.

In 2002, Dafis announced he would step down from the Assembly at the 2003 elections, despite party leader Ieuan Wyn Jones having asked him not to do so. Soon after the elections in 2003, he announced his candidacy for Presidency of the party, but lost to Dafydd Iwan.

== Honours ==
He was made an Honorary Fellow of Aberystwyth University on 15 July 2010.

== Sources ==
- Burchell, Jon (2000). "Here Comes the Greens (Again): The Green Party in Britain during the 1990s". Environmental Politics. 9 (3): 145–150. Bibcode:2000EnvPo...9..145B. doi:10.1080/09644010008414543. S2CID 153800709.
- Steer, Alfie (11 November 2024). "Cynog Dafis: Britain's first Green MP?". The History of Parliament (Research blog). London: Institute of Historical Research, University of London.

Parliament of the United Kingdom
Preceded by Geraint Howells	Member of Parliament for Ceredigion; 1992–2000	Succeeded by Simon Thomas
Senedd
New title	Assembly Member for Mid and West Wales; 1999 – 2003	Succeeded by Helen Mary Jones
