= Llanarth, Ceredigion =

Village and community in Ceredigion, Wales

Llanarth
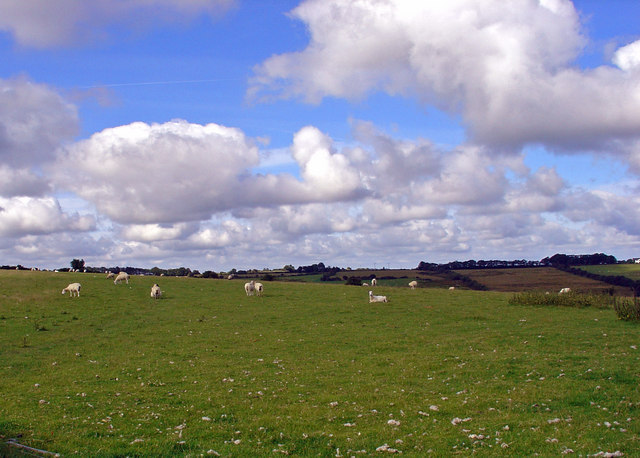
- Sheep field at Gelligenlas, Llanarth

- Location within Ceredigion
- Population: 1,616 (2011)
- OS grid reference: SN423575
  - Cardiff: 90 mi (140 km)SE
- Principal area: Ceredigion
- Preserved county: Dyfed
- Country: Wales
- Sovereign state: United Kingdom
- Post town: LLANDYSUL
- Postcode district: SA44
- Post town: LLANARTH
- Postcode district: SA47
- Post town: LAMPETER
- Postcode district: SA48
- Dialling code: 01545
- Police: Dyfed-Powys
- Fire: Mid and West Wales
- Ambulance: Welsh
- UK Parliament: Ceredigion Preseli
- Senedd Cymru – Welsh Parliament: Ceredigion Penfro
- List of places UK Wales Ceredigion 52.194°N 4.307°W Community map: Map of the community

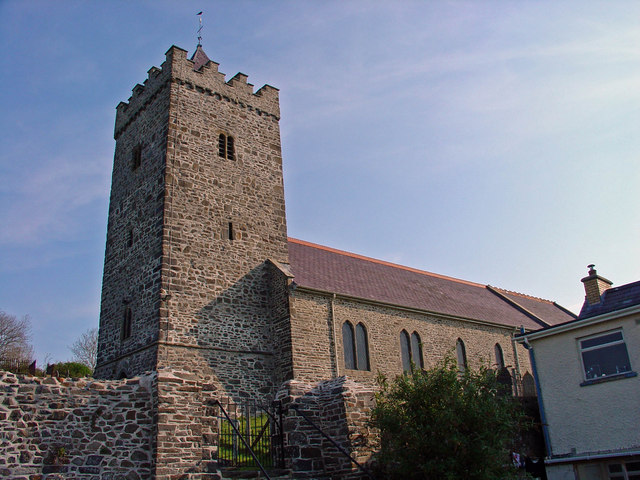
St David's parish church

Llanarth is a small village and community in Ceredigion, Wales. It is on the A487 road and is about 3 miles (4.8 km) from both Aberaeron and New Quay. The community includes the village of Synod Inn and the hamlets Llaingarreglwyd and Rhyd-y-Beillen.

== Church ==
The parish church of St David's, once dedicated to St Fylltyg, is a Grade II* listed building. It was renovated in 1872. A stone in the churchyard is sometimes pointed out as bearing the Devil's footprint. According to legend, he was trying to steal one of the church's bells one night but woke the vicar, who drove him off. He left the footprint as he fled.

== Amenities ==
Llanarth has a petrol station, post office, a primary school, a public house, a butcher, a convenience store and a garden centre.

== Notable residents ==
- John Evans (died 1779), born at Meini Gwynion, curate of Portsmouth.
- Daniel Lewis Lloyd (1843–1899), schoolteacher and cleric, Bishop of Bangor, buried in Llanarth.
- Dafydd Jones (born 1979), Welsh rugby international and Llanelli Scarlets player was brought up in Llanarth.
