= Llanwnnen =

Village in Ceredigion, Wales

Coordinates: 52.104°N 4.143°W

- Village and community
- Location within Ceredigion
- Principal area: Ceredigion
- Country: Wales
- Sovereign state: United Kingdom
- Police: Dyfed-Powys
- Fire: Mid and West Wales
- Ambulance: Welsh
- List of places UK Wales Ceredigion Community map: Map of the community

Llanwnnen is a village, parish and community located in the county of Ceredigion, Wales.

The population of the community taken at the 2011 census was 490.

It is one of the more Welsh communities in Ceredigion with around 70% of the population having some form of Welsh identity according to the 2011 census.

The community contains the rural area Neudd-fawr.
