= Ceredigion Preseli =

UK Parliament constituency (since 2024)

- constituency for the House of Commons
- Interactive map of the constituency.
- Location of the constituency within Wales
- Electorate: 74,063 (March 2020)
- Major settlements: Aberaeron, Aberystwyth, Cardigan, Fishguard, Lampeter.

Current constituency
- Member of Parliament: Ben Lake (Plaid Cymru)
- Seats: One
- Created from: Ceredigion, Preseli Pembrokeshire

Overlaps
- Senedd: Ceredigion Penfro

Ceredigion Preseli is a constituency of the House of Commons in the UK Parliament, first contested at the 2024 general election following the 2023 review of Westminster constituencies. It is currently represented by Ben Lake of Plaid Cymru, who represented the predecessor constituency of Ceredigion from 2017 to 2024.

== Boundaries ==
Under the 2023 review, the constituency was defined as being composed of the following, as they existed on 1 December 2020:

- The County of Ceredigion.
- The County of Pembrokeshire wards of: Cilgerran; Clydau; Crymych; Dinas Cross; Fishguard North East; Fishguard North West; Goodwick; Llanrhian; Maenclochog; Newport; St. Dogmael’s; and Scleddau.

Following local government boundary reviews which came into effect in May 2022, the constituency now comprises the following from the 2024 general election:

- The County of Ceredigion.
- The County of Pembrokeshire wards of: Boncath and Clydau; Bro Gwaun; Cilgerran and Eglwyswrw; Crymych and Mynachlog-ddu; Fishguard: North East; Fishguard: North West; Goodwick; Llanrhian; Maenclochog; Newport and Dinas; St. Dogmaels; and Wiston (part).

It comprises the whole of the abolished Ceredigion constituency, which was coterminous with the county of the same name, together with northern parts of Pembrokeshire, including Fishguard, previously part of the abolished Preseli Pembrokeshire constituency.

== Members of Parliament ==
Election	Member	Party
2024	Ben Lake	Plaid Cymru

== Election results ==
=== Elections in the 2020s ===
General election 2024: Ceredigion Preseli
Party	Candidate	Votes	%	±%
Plaid Cymru	Ben Lake	21,738	46.9	+15.8
Liberal Democrats	Mark Williams	6,949	15.0	+0.4
Labour Co-op	Jackie Jones	5,386	11.6	−9.2
Reform	Karl Robert Pollard	5,374	11.6	+7.6
Conservative	Aled Thomas	4,763	10.3	−18.0
Green	Tomos Barlow	1,864	4.0	+2.7
Workers Party	Taghrid Al-Mawed	228	0.5	N/A
Majority		14,789	31.9	+29.1
Turnout		46,302	61.2	−8.6
Registered electors		75,690		
Plaid Cymru win (new seat)				

=== Elections in the 2010s ===
2019 notional result (Note: Estimate of the 2019 general election result as if the revised boundaries recommended under the 2023 boundary review were in place)
Party	Vote	%
Plaid Cymru	16,045	31.1
Conservative	14,602	28.3
Labour	10,733	20.8
Liberal Democrats	7,561	14.6
Brexit Party	2,063	4.0
Green Party	663	1.3
Majority	1,443	2.8
Turnout	51,667	69.8
Electorate	74,063	
