= University of Wales (UK Parliament constituency) =

UK Parliament constituency (1918–1950)

- Former university constituency for the House of Commons

1918–1950

University of Wales was a university constituency electing one member to the House of Commons of the Parliament of the United Kingdom, from 1918 to 1950. It returned one Member of Parliament (MP), elected under the first-past-the-post voting system.

== Boundaries ==
This university constituency was created by the Representation of the People Act 1918. It was abolished in 1950 by the Representation of the People Act 1948.

The constituency was not a physical area. Its electorate consisted of the graduates of the University of Wales.

Unlike many other university constituencies, University of Wales never elected a Conservative MP, instead regularly electing Liberal MPs.

The constituency returned one Member of Parliament.

== Members of Parliament ==
Election	Member	Party	Notes
1918	Herbert Lewis	Coalition Liberal	
Jan 1922	Herbert Lewis	National Liberal	
1922	Thomas Arthur Lewis	National Liberal	died 18 July 1923
1923	George Davies	Christian Pacifist/Labour	
1924	Ernest Evans	Liberal	appointed County Court Judge in 1943
1943 by-election	William John Gruffydd	Liberal	
1950	University constituencies abolished		

== Elections ==
The elections in this constituency took place using the first past the post electoral system. In university seats, in this period, the polls were open for five days and voting did not take place on the polling day for the territorial constituencies.

=== Elections of the 1910s ===
Herbert Lewis

General election 1918: University of Wales
Party		Candidate	Votes	%
C	National Liberal	Herbert Lewis	739	80.8
	Labour	Millicent Mackenzie	176	19.2
Majority			563	61.6
Turnout			915	85.8
	National Liberal win (new seat)			
C indicates candidate endorsed by the coalition government.

=== Elections of the 1920s ===
- In January 1922 Coalition Liberals formed the National Liberal Party.

T.A. Lewis

General election 1922: University of Wales
Party	Candidate	Votes	%	±%
National Liberal	Thomas Arthur Lewis	487	39.5	–41.3
Liberal	Ellis Ellis-Griffith	451	35.9	New
Labour	Olive Wheeler	309	24.8	+5.6
Majority		46	3.6	−58.0
Turnout		1,247	87.2	+1.4
National Liberal hold		Swing		

- Seat vacant at the dissolution of Parliament, following the death of Lewis on 18 July 1923

General election 1923: University of Wales
Party	Candidate	Votes	%	±%
Christian Pacifist (Labour)	George Davies	570	35.7	+10.9
Liberal	Joseph Jones	560	35.1	−0.8
Independent Liberal	John Edwards	467	29.2	New
Majority		10	0.6	N/A
Turnout		1.597	83.1	−4.1
Christian Pacifist gain from Liberal				

Ernest Evans

General election 1924: University of Wales
Party	Candidate	Votes	%	±%
Liberal	Ernest Evans	1,057	59.4	+24.3
Christian Pacifist (Labour)	George Davies	721	40.6	+4.9
Majority		336	18.6	N/A
Turnout		1,778		
Liberal gain from Christian Pacifist		Swing		

General election 1929: University of Wales
Party	Candidate	Votes	%	±%
Liberal	Ernest Evans	1,712	63.5	+4.1
Labour	David W. Richards	671	24.9	New
Unionist	Courtenay Mansel	314	11.6	New
Majority		1,041	38.6	+20.0
Turnout		2,697	74.4	
Liberal hold		Swing		

=== Elections of the 1930s ===
General election 1931: University of Wales
Party	Candidate	Votes	%	±%
Liberal	Ernest Evans	2,229	75.4	+11.9
Plaid Cymru	Saunders Lewis	914	24.6	New
Majority		1,315	50.8	+12.2
Turnout		3,143	61.4	−13.0
Liberal hold		Swing		

General election 1935: University of Wales
Party	Candidate	Votes	%	±%
Liberal	Ernest Evans	2,796	61.3	−14.1
Labour	Ithel Davies	1,768	38.7	New
Majority		1,028	22.6	−28.2
Turnout		4,564	62.3	+0.9
Liberal hold		Swing		

=== Elections of the 1940s ===
General Election 1939–40: Another General Election was required to take place before the end of 1940. The political parties had been making preparations for an election to take place from 1939 and by the end of this year, the following candidates had been selected;

- Liberal: Ernest Evans

University of Wales by-election, 1943
Party	Candidate	Votes	%	±%
Liberal	William John Gruffydd	3,098	52.3	−9.0
Plaid Cymru	Saunders Lewis	1,330	22.5	New
Independent	Alun Talfan Davies	755	12.8	New
Independent Labour	Evan Davies	634	10.7	New
Independent Labour	Neville Lawrence Evans	101	1.7	New
Majority		1,768	29.8	+7.2
Turnout		5,918	53.4	−8.9
Liberal hold		Swing		

General election 1945: University of Wales
Party	Candidate	Votes	%	±%
Liberal	William John Gruffydd	5,239	75.5	+14.2
Plaid Cymru	Gwenan Jones	1,696	24.5	+2.0
Majority		3,543	51.0	+27.4
Turnout		6,935	58.5	−3.8
Liberal hold		Swing		

== See also ==
- 1943 University of Wales by-election

== Sources ==
- British Parliamentary Election Results 1918–1949, by F.W.S. Craig (Macmillan 1977)
- Who's Who of British members of parliament, Vol. III 1918–1945, edited by M. Stenton and S. Lees (The Harvester Press 1979)
