= 1943 University of Wales by-election =

1943 Welsh parliamentary by-election

The 1943 University of Wales by-election was a parliamentary by-election held in the United Kingdom between 25 and 29 January 1943 for the House of Commons constituency of University of Wales.

== Previous MP ==
Ernest Evans

The seat had become vacant when the constituency's Liberal Member of Parliament (MP), Ernest Evans (1885–1965) had been appointed a county court Judge in 1942.

Evans was admitted to the bar in 1910 and became a King's Counsel (KC) in 1937.

After serving as private secretary to the prime minister David Lloyd George, he was elected as Coalition Liberal MP for Cardiganshire at a by-election in 1921. He held the seat at the 1922 general election as a National Liberal candidate, but was defeated standing as a Liberal at the 1923 general election by the Independent Liberal Rhys Hopkin Morris.

Evans did not stand again in Cardiganshire, but at the 1924 general election he defeated the Christian pacifist George Maitland Lloyd Davies to win the University of Wales constituency as a Liberal.

== Candidates ==
The election took place during the Second World War. Under an agreement between the Conservative, Labour and Liberal parties, who were participating in a wartime coalition, the party holding a seat would not be opposed by the other two at a by-election. Accordingly, the Liberal Party nominated a candidate, but no Labour or Conservative representative was put forward. Plaid Cymru, which was not a party to the electoral agreement, selected a candidate and three independent candidates also stood; so a contested poll took place.

The list of candidates below is set out in descending order of the number of votes received at the by-election.

=== Liberal Party ===
The Liberal Party candidate was Professor William John Gruffydd (1881–1954), who was Professor of Celtic at University College, Cardiff from 1918 until 1946 and then an emeritus professor. He was editor of Y Llenor ("The Literary Man") from 1922 until 1951.

Gruffydd came from a nonconformist, radical family, and took an interest in Welsh politics and social questions. He was at one time a member of Plaid Cymru and served as its deputy vice-president in 1937.

Gruffydd had voiced doubts about Plaid Cymru party president Saunders Lewis' ideas since 1933, and by 1943 he had joined the Liberal Party. The "brilliant but wayward" Gruffydd was a favourite with Welsh-speaking intellectuals.

Gruffydd was elected to Parliament as a Liberal MP for the University of Wales seat on 29 January 1943. He and Saunders Lewis had effectively split the Welsh-speaking community. He was comfortably re-elected in the 1945 general election and sat until the abolition of university seats in 1950. He did not stand again for Parliament.

=== Plaid Cymru ===
Representing Plaid Cymru in the by-election was its president, (John) Saunders Lewis, who had previously contested the university seat at the 1931 general election.

Lewis (15 October 1893 – 1 September 1985) was a Welsh poet, dramatist, historian, literary critic and political activist. He was a prominent Welsh nationalist and founder of the Welsh National Party (Plaid Genedlaethol Cymru, later known as Plaid Cymru). Lewis is usually acknowledged as among the most prominent figures of 20th century Welsh-language literature. Lewis was a 1970 Nobel nominee for literature, and in 2005 came 10th in a BBC Wales poll for Wales' "greatest-ever person".

The election effectively split the Welsh-speaking intelligentsia, and left Lewis embittered with politics, and he retired from direct political involvement. However, the experience proved invaluable for Plaid Cymru, as they began to refer to themselves, as "for the first time they were taken seriously as a political force." The by-election campaign led directly to "considerable growth" in the party's membership.

=== Others ===
- Alun Talfan Davies (22 July 1913 – 11 November 2000) was a Welsh lawyer, writer and publisher, the brother of Aneirin Talfan Davies. A former member of Plaid Cymru, he stood as an independent candidate in the by-election. He subsequently contested Carmarthen in the 1959 and 1964 general elections, as well as Denbigh in 1966. In all of these other contests he stood as a Liberal candidate.
- The more successful of the two Independent Labour candidates contesting the by-election was Evan Davies, who did not contest any other Parliamentary elections.
- The second placed Independent Labour candidate, who finished bottom of the poll at the by-election, was N.L. Evans. He did not contest any other Parliamentary election.

== Result ==
1943 University of Wales by-election
| Party | Candidate | Votes | % | ±% |
|---|---|---|---|---|
| Liberal | William John Gruffydd | 3,098 | 52.3 | −9.0 |
| Plaid Cymru | Saunders Lewis | 1,330 | 22.5 | N/A |
| Independent | Alun Talfan Davies | 755 | 12.8 | N/A |
| Independent Labour | Evan Davies | 634 | 10.7 | N/A |
| Independent Labour | N.L. Evans | 101 | 1.7 | N/A |
| Majority | | 1,768 | 29.8 | +7.2 |
| Turnout | | 5,918 | 53.4 | −8.9 |
| Registered electors | | 11,079 | | |
| Liberal hold | | Swing | N/A | |

== Previous election ==
1935 general election: University of Wales
| Party | Candidate | Votes | % | ±% |
|---|---|---|---|---|
| Liberal | Ernest Evans | 2,796 | 61.3 | −14.1 |
| Labour | I. Davies | 1,768 | 38.7 | N/A |
| Majority | | 1,028 | 22.6 | −28.2 |
| Turnout | | 4,564 | 62.3 | +0.9 |
| Registered electors | | 7,325 | | |
| Liberal hold | | Swing | N/A | |

== See also ==
- University of Wales constituency
- List of United Kingdom by-elections
- United Kingdom by-election records

== Sources ==
- British Parliamentary Election Results 1918-1949, compiled and edited by F.W.S. Craig (Macmillan Press 1977)
- Who's Who of British Members of Parliament, Volume III 1919-1945, edited by M. Stenton and S. Lees (Harvester Press 1979)
