= Jeppe Aakjær bibliography =

This is a list of works by Danish poet and novelist Jeppe Aakjær.

== List ==
- Missionen og dens Høvding [The Mission and its Chieftain] (Copenhagen: J. Erslev, 1897)
- Bondens Søn: Skildringer fra Fjends Herred [The Peasant's Son: Pictures from the Fjend District] (Copenhagen: V. Oscar Søtofte, 1899)
- Derude fra Kjœrene: Digte [Out There from the Watering Holes: Poems](Copenhagen: V. Oscar Søtofte, 1899)
- Vadmelsfolk: Hedefortællinger [Homespunfolk: Heath Stories] (Copenhagen: V. Oscar Søtofte, 1900)
- Fjandboer: Fortællinger fra Heden [Fjand Dwellers: Stories from Heden] (Copenhagen: Gyldendal, 1901)
- Ruskantate: Studenter Samfundet, 26 September 1903 [Ruskantate: Student Union, 26 September 1903] (Copenhagen: O. C. Olsen, 1903)
- Steen Steensen Blichers Livs-Tragedie i Breve og Aktstykker, [Steen Steensen Blicher's Life Tragedy in Letters and Documents] 3 volumes in 36 parts (Copenhagen & Christiana: Gyldendal, 1903-1904)
- Vredens Børn: Et Tyendes Saga [Children of Wrath: A Servant's Saga] (Copenhagen: Gyldendal, 1904)
- Fra Jul til Sanct Hans: Historier [From Christmas (yule) to Midsummer: Stories] (Copenhagen: Gyldendal, 1905)
- Fri Felt: En Digtsamling [Open Field: A Poem Collection] (Copenhagen: Gyldendal, 1905)
- Rugens Sange og Andre Digte [Songs of the Rye and Other Poems] (Copenhagen: Gyldendal, 1906)
- Livet paa Hegnsgaard: Bondekomedie i fire Akter [Life at Hegns Farm: Rural Comedy in Four Acts] (Copenhagen: Gyldendal, 1907)
- Paa Aftægt: En Fortælling [In Retirement: A Story] (Copenhagen: Gyldendal, 1907)
- Hvor Bønder bor: Tolv Smaahistorier [Where farmers live: Twelve Small Stories] (Copenhagen: Gyldendal, 1908)
- Muld og Malm: En Digtsamling [Mold and Malm: A Collection of Poems] (Copenhagen & Christiana: Gyldendal, 1909)
- Ulvens Søn: Skuespil i fire Akter [The Wolf's Son: Play in Four Acts] (Copenhagen: Gyldendal, 1909)
- Den Sommer og den Eng: Digte [The Summer and the Meadow: Poems] (Copenhagen: Gyldendal, 1910)
- Af Gammel Jehannes hans Bivelskistaarri: En bette Bog om stur' Folk [From Old Jehanne's Bible Stories: A Little Book about Big Folk] (Copenhagen: Gyldendal, 1911)
- Frederik Tapbjergs Plovgilde: Udvalgte Fortaellinger [Frederik Tapbjergs Plough Guild: Featured Stories] (Copenhagen & Christiana: Gyldendal, 1911)
- Naar Bønder elsker: Skuespil i fem Akter [When Peasant's Love: Play in Five Acts] (Copenhagen & Christiana: Gyldendal, 1911)
- Hytter i Alle Lande: Et Foredrag [Cottages in All Countries: A Lecture] (Copenhagen: Skandinavisk Boghandel, 1912)
- Jævnt Humør: Smaahistorier [Smooth humor: Small Stories] (Copenhagen: Gyldendal, 1913)
- Esper Tækki: En Sallingbo-Empe (Copenhagen: Gyldendal, 1913)
- Sommer-Taler [Summer Speeches] (Copenhagen: Gyldendal, 1913)
- Arbejdets Glæde: En Fortælling om Bønder [Happiness of work: A Tale of peasants] (Copenhagen: Gyldendal, 1914)
- Fir' Fjandbo-Saang: Ett for Lett og ett for Laang [Fir 'Fjandbo-Saang: one for light and one for Lange] (Holstebro: Printed by Niels P. Thomsen, 1915)
- Hedevandringer [Heath walks] (Copenhagen & Christiana: Gyldendal, 1915)
- Jens Langkniv: Af Fjends Herreds Krønike Bog [Jens Longknife: From the Chronicles of the Fjend District] (Copenhagen: Gyldendal, 1915)
- Hvor der er gjærende Kræfter: Landarbejderroman [Where There are Fermenting Powers: Farmworker Novel] (Copenhagen & Christiana: Gyldendal, 1916)
- Livog Sang: Digte i Udvalg [Life And Song: Poems of the Committee] (Copenhagen: Gyldendal, 1916)
- Vejr og Vind og Folkesind: Digte [Rain and Wind and Folkspirit: Poems] (Copenhagen: Gyldendal, 1916)
- En Skarns Præst og Andre Syndere: Kulturbilleder fra Hjemstavnen [A skarns priest and Other Sinners: Cultural Images from the homeland] (Copenhagen: Pios Vignet-Bøger, 1917)
- Himmelbjærgpræsten: Et Skuespil [The Minister of Himmelbjæarg: A Play] (Copenhagen & Christiana: Gyldendal, 1917)
- Fremtidens Bondehjem [The Future Peasant Home] (Copenhagen: Gyldendal, 1918)
- Ravperler, Julen 1918 [Amber beads, Christmas 1918] (Holstebro: Printed by Niels P. Thomsen, 1918)
- Af min Hjemstavns Saga: Lidt Bondehistorie [From My Provincial Sage: Little Farmer Story] (Copenhagen & Christiana: Gyldendal, 1919)
- Glimmersand: Smaavers, Julen 1919 [Glimmer Sand: Small Verses, Christmas 1919] (Holstebro: Printed by Niels P. Thomsen, 1919)
- Mit Regnebræt: En Selvbibliografi [My Fair Board: An Autobiography] (Copenhagen: Det Akademiske Antikvariat, 1919)
- En Daad [The Deed] (Copenhagen: Gyldendal, 1920)
- Rejserids af Viborg Amt, Julen 1920 [Travel Outline of Viborg, Christmas 1920] (Holstebro: Printed by Niels P. Thomsen, 1920)
- Hjærtegræs og Ærenpris: Digtsamling [Quaking Grass and Speedwell: Poem Collection] (Copenhagen: Gyldendal, 1921)
- Den ny Klokke: En Historie fra Heden, Julen 1921 [The new Bell: A Story from Heden, Christmas 1921] (Holstebro: Printed by Niels P. Thomsen, 1921)
- Pigen fra Limfjorden: Roman [Girl of the Fjord: A Novel] (Copenhagen: Danske Forfatteres Forlag, 1921)
- Min første Jul: En Skizze, Julen 1922 [My first Christmas: A sketch, Christmas 1922] (Holstebro: Printed by Niels P. Thomsen, 1922)
- Bonden og Hans Jord: Et Digt, Julen 1923 [The peasant and His Land: A Poem, Christmas 1923] (Holstebro: Printed by Niels P. Thomsen, 1923)
- Po fir glowend Pœl: Fra jen si bitte Tid: En Sagnsamling [On Four Glowing Posts: From My Childhood: A Myth Collection] (Copenhagen: Gyldendal, 1923)
- Hejmdals Vandringer: Et Højsommerdigt [Hejmdals Wanderings: A High summer Poem] (Copenhagen: Gyldendal, 1924)
- I Oplysningens Tjeneste: Et Ungdomsminde Julen 1924 [Mission of the Enlightenment: A Youth Memorial Christmas 1924] (Holstebro: Printed by Niels P. Thomsen, 1924)
- Kongenshus: En Luftspejling, Julen 1925 [Kongenshus: A Miracle, Christmas 1925] (Holstebro: Printed by Niels P. Thomsen, 1925)
- Rejsegildet: Skuespil i 5 Akter [The Going-Away Party: Play in 5 Acts] (Copenhagen: Gyldendal, 1925)
- Steen Steensen Blicher: Hans Personlighed og hans Muse Julen 1926 [Steen Steensen Blicher: His Personality and His Muse Christmas 1926] (Holstebro: Printed by Niels P. Thomsen, 1926)
- Min hædersdag paa Kjøbenhavns Raadhus 10 September 1926 [My Day of Glory at Copenhagen City Hall 10 September 1926] (Holstebro: Printed by Niels P. Thomsen, 1927)
- Under Aftenstjernen: Digte [Under the Evening Star: Poems] (Copenhagen: Gyldendal, 1927)
- En bristet Drøm: Blicher og Himmelbjærgfesterne [A Ruptured Dream: Blicher Heaven and Mountain festivals] (Copenhagen: Gyldendal, 1927)
- Fra min Bitte-Tid: En Kulturhistorisk Selvbiografi [From My Childhood: A Cultural Historical Autobiography] (Copenhagen: Gyldendal, 1928)
- Svenske Jacob og hans Vise, Julen 1928 [Svenske Jacob and his song, Christmas 1928] (Holstebro: Printed by Niels P. Thomsen, 1928)
- Drengeaar og Knøsekaar: Kilderne springer og Bækken gaar [Boyhood Years and Laddish Years: The Wells Spring and the Stream Flows] (Copenhagen: Gyldendal, 1929)
- Før det dages: Minder fra Halvfemserne [Before Dawn: Memories from the Nineties] (Copenhagen: Gyldendal, 1929)
- Langs Karupaaens Bred: Studier fra Hjenstavnen [Along Karup's Riverside: Studies From the Homeland] (Copenhagen: Gyldendal, 1929)
- Markedet og Markedsviser [The market and Market Shows] (Holstebro: Printed by Niels P. Thomsen, 1929)
- Fra Agermuld og Hedesand: Studier fra Hjemstavnen [From Arable Mulch and Heath Sand: Studies from the homeland] (Copenhagen: Gyldendal, 1930)
- Konge, Adel og andre Sallingboer: Studier fra Hjemstavnen [King, Adel and Salling Boer: Studies from the homeland] (Copenhagen: Gyldendal, 1930)
- En Samling Breve og Papirer udgivet som Manuskript, [The European Court Letters and Papers published as Manuscript] edited by George Saxild (Copenhagen: Gyldendal, 1931)
- Gammel Brug og Gammel Brøde: Studier fra Hjemstavnen [Old Use and the Old guilt: Studies from the homeland] (Copenhagen: Gyldendal, 1931)
- Spildkorn: Dedicationer og Smaavers, [Waste Grains: Dedicationer and the Small Verse] collected and edited by Solveig Aakjær (Copenhagen: Printed by Niels P. Thomsen, 1931)
- Digte og Noveller: Spredte Fund i Jenles Bibliothek i Maj 1932 [Poems and Short Stories: Scattered Findings of Jenle Bibliothek in May 1932] (Copenhagen: Gyldendal, 1932)
- Fra Sallingland til Øresund: Studier fra Hjemstavnen, [From Sallingland to the Øresund: Studies from the homeland] edited bu August F. Schmidt (Copenhagen: Gyldendal, 1932)
- Muld og Mænd: Studier fra Hjemstavnen [Mulch and Men: Studies from the homeland] (Copenhagen: Gyldendal, 1932)
- Efterladte Erindringer: Fra Tiden Omkring Aarhundred-Skiftet of Fremefter, [Posthumous Memories: From Times around the Turn of the Century and Afterwards] edited by Saxild (Copenhagen: Gyldendal, 1934)
- Bjergmands-snak [Mound-Dwellers talk] (Lemuig: Privattryk, 1949)

=== Editions and collections ===
- Skrifter, [Writings] 10 volumes (Copenhagen, 1912-1913)
- Samlede Værker, [The Collected Works] 8 volumes in 7 (Copenhagen & Christiana: Gyldendal, 1918-1919)
- Samlede Digte: Mindeudgave [Collected Poems: Commemorative Edition], edited by Svend Aakjær, 3 volumes (Copenhagen: Gyldendal, 1931)
- Over den Blanke Aa: Udvalgte Prosaværker [Above the Glossy Aa River: Selected Prose Works], 2 volumes, edited by Svend Akjær (Copenhagen: Gyldendal, 1938) comprises Vadmeisfolk, Bondens aon Peasant Aon, Af Gammel Johannes hans Bivelskistaarr, Arbejdets Glæde [The Work of Joy], Jyske folkeminder [Jutlandic Folklore], edited by Bengt Holbek, Danmarks folkeminder, #76 (Copenhagen: Munksgaard, 1966)
- De stille folk: Sociale Artikler og Fortællinger [The Quiet People: Social Articles and Narratives], edited by Solvejg Bjerre & Hans Jørn Christensen (Copenhagen: Gyldendal 1980)
- Digte af Jeppe Aakjær [Poems by Jeppe Aakjær], edited by Asger Schnack (Copenhagen: Gyldendal 1988)

=== Editions in English ===
- Four Poems, translated by J. A. Peehl (1917), comprises Clear View, Jutland, Jutland's Heath, The Land of Heather
- A Song of the Rye, translated by Robert S. Hillyer, American-Scandinavian Review, 12 (1924): 669
- Songs of the Heath, translated by J. Glyn Davies (Llanfairfeachan Wales: H. Glyn Davies, 1962)
- Off for the Day, translated by W. Glyn Jones in Contemporary Danish Prose, edited by Elias Bredsdorff (Copenhagen: Gyldedal, 1958) pp. 29–40

=== Other ===
- Fræ wor Hjemmen. Vers og Prosa i jydsk Mundart, edited by Aakjær (Aarhus: Det jydske Forlag, 1902)
- Jydsk Stævne: Et Aarsskrift [Jutland Event: The Aarsskrift], edited by Aakjær (Aarhus, 1902)
- Danmark: Illustretet Almanak udgivet af den danske Presse [Denmark: Illustrated Almanac published by the Danish Press], edited by Aakjær and Gustave Hetsch (Copenhagen, 1919-1924)
- Steen Steensen Blichers Samlede Skrifter [Steen Steensen Blichers Collected Works], 33 volumes, edited by Aakjær and others (Copenhagen: Gyldendal, 1920-1934)
- Four poems of Jeppe Aakjær, translated by J. A. Peehl, (Wheaton, IL: W. Wakeslee, 1917)
- A book of Danish verse, translated by Robert Silliman Hillyer, (New York: American-Scandinavian Foundation, 1922)
- A World of Song, translated by S. D. Rodholm, (Blair, NE: Danish Lutheran Publishing House, 1941)
- The Jutland Wind, translated by R. P. Keigwin, (Oxford: B. Blackwell, 1944)
- A second book of Danish verse, translated by Charles Wharton Stork, (New York: American-Scandinavian Foundation, 1947)
- In Denmark I was born, translated by R. P. Keigwin, (Copenhagen: A. F. Høst, 1948)
- Songs from Denmark, translated by S. D. Rodholm, (Copenhagen: Det danske Selskab, 1988)
