= Angharad James =

Angharad James may refer to:

- Angharad James (footballer) (born 1994), Welsh football midfielder
- Angharad James (poet) (1677–1749), Welsh harpist and poet
