= Cwrtmawr manuscripts =

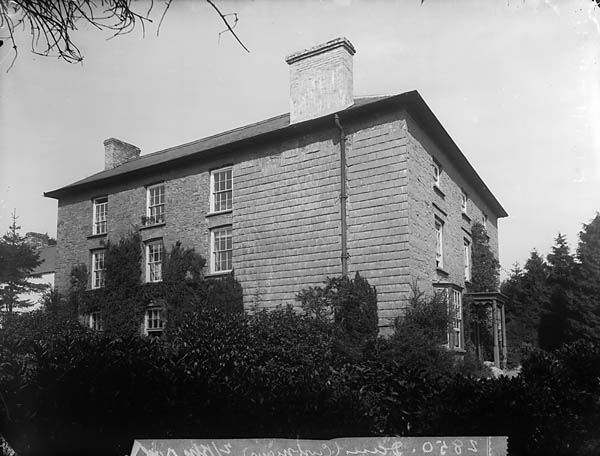
Cwrtmawr, Llangeitho, c. 1885; photograph by John Thomas

The Cwrtmawr Manuscripts are a collection of 1,549 volumes of medieval Welsh documents, mainly texts of Welsh literature, collected by John Humphreys Davies, who lived at Cwrtmawr near Llangeitho in Ceredigion and was principal of the University College of Wales, Aberystwyth from 1919-1926. The manuscripts are now kept in the National Library of Wales.

== History ==
John Humphreys Davies was a bibliographer whose interest in Welsh literature and culture manifested in the collection of manuscripts that he acquired from many different sources over a period of many years. In his Report on Manuscripts in the Welsh Language for the Historical Manuscripts Commission, J. Gwenogvryn Evans gave credit to Davies for rediscovering manuscripts that were considered to be lost and drawing attention to other, previously unknown manuscripts. Evans also stated that despite being too modern to fall within the scope of his Report, the collection of Welsh Ballads in Cwrtmawr manuscripts are "very valuable". In 1925, Davies transferred the fifty manuscripts that Evans had catalogued (i.e. Cwrtmawr 1-50) to the National Library of Wales. He bequeathed the entire collection to the National Library when he died on 10 August 1926.

== Composition ==
A greater proportion of the Cwrtmawr manuscripts are from the 18th and 19th centuries, but 16th and 17th-century manuscripts are also present. The collection is predominantly of Welsh literary interest and contains a variety of material, including religious works such as sermons and hymns, volumes of annotated press cuttings, holograph letters, diaries and journals, account books, pedigrees, commonplace books, recipes, dictionaries, music, and notes on philology and bibliography.

== Incorporated groups ==
John Humphreys Davies acquired the Cwrtmawr manuscripts over a long period of time and from many sources. The largest group consists of those Davies acquired from John Jones (Myrddin Fardd) on various occasions. Other substantial groups are from the collections of the Richards family, Revs. Peter Bailey Williams and St George Armstrong Williams, William John Roberts (Gwilym Cowlyd), and Rev. Daniel Silvan Evans.

In addition to the major groups there are a number of important smaller ones. It includes manuscripts relating to each of the following: manuscript transcriber Margaret Davies (c. 1700–1785); Morris Davies (1796–1876), author, hymnologist and musician; William Davies (1805–1859); Independent minister and schoolmaster David Ellis; James Spinther James (1837-1914), Baptist historian Owen Jones, 'Manoethwy' (1838–1866); schoolteacher and writer Owen Jones (1833–1899); Calvinistic Methodist minister, writer and bibliophile Richard Robert Jones (Dic Aberdaron); Lewis Morris; Robert Prys Morris (c. 1831–1890), local historian and antiquary; John Peter (Ioan Pedr, 1833–1877), Independent minister and Welsh scholar; Hugh Pugh (1803–1868), Independent minister and schoolmaster; and Robert Williams (1810–1881), cleric, Celtic scholar and antiquary.

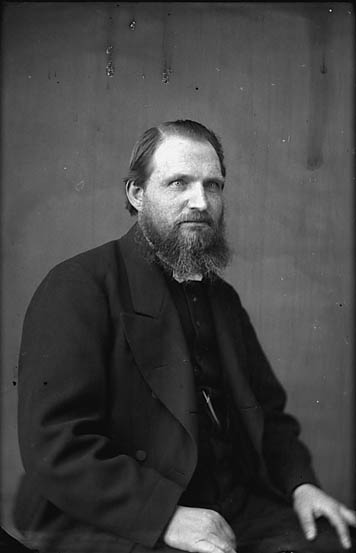
James Spinther James (1837–1914) NLW3364188

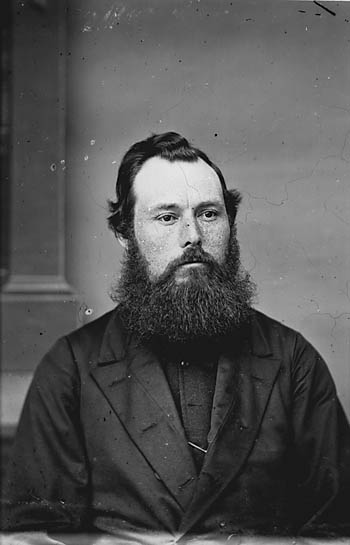
John Peter (Ioan Pedr, 1833–1877) NLW3365404

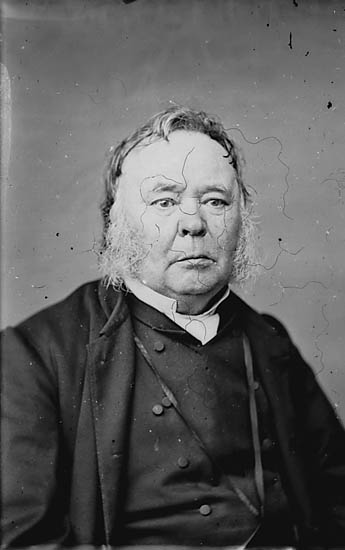
Hugh Pugh (1803–1868) NLW3365418

=== John Jones (Myrddin Fardd) ===
About half the items that J. Gwenogvryn Evans described in his Report on the Cwrtmawr Manuscripts were acquired from Myrddin Fardd. Other manuscripts and letters are tied to poets and literati of the late-18th and 19th centuries, including David Thomas (Dafydd Ddu Eryri), Owen Williams (Owain Gwyrfai) and Ebenezer Thomas (Eben Fardd). There are many volume of letters that were published or received by Myrddin Fardd and over 150 volumes he compiled of Welsh literary and antiquarian interest.

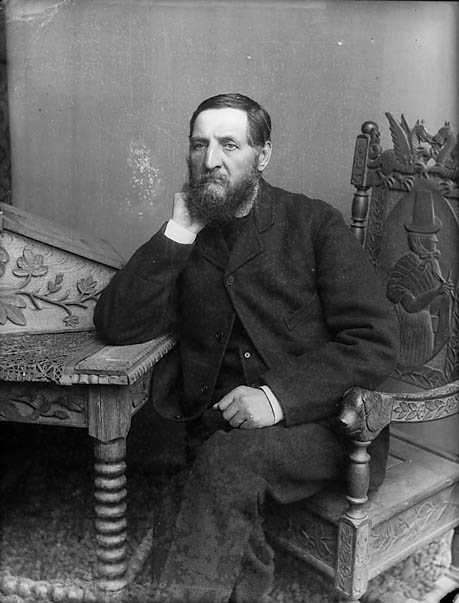
Myrddin Fardd

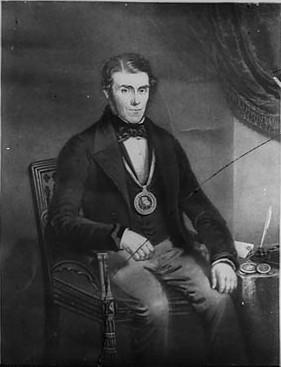
Eben Fardd

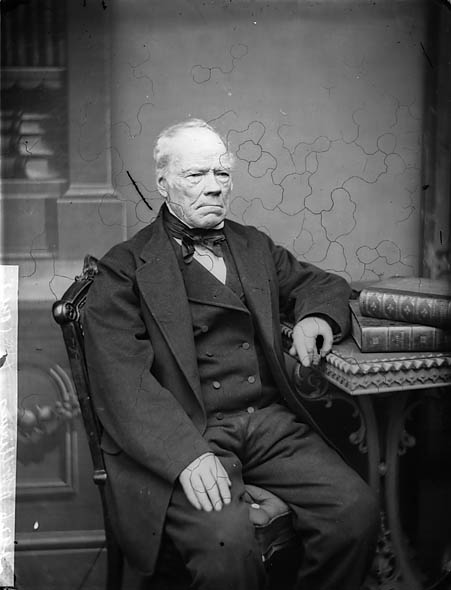
Owain Gwyrfai

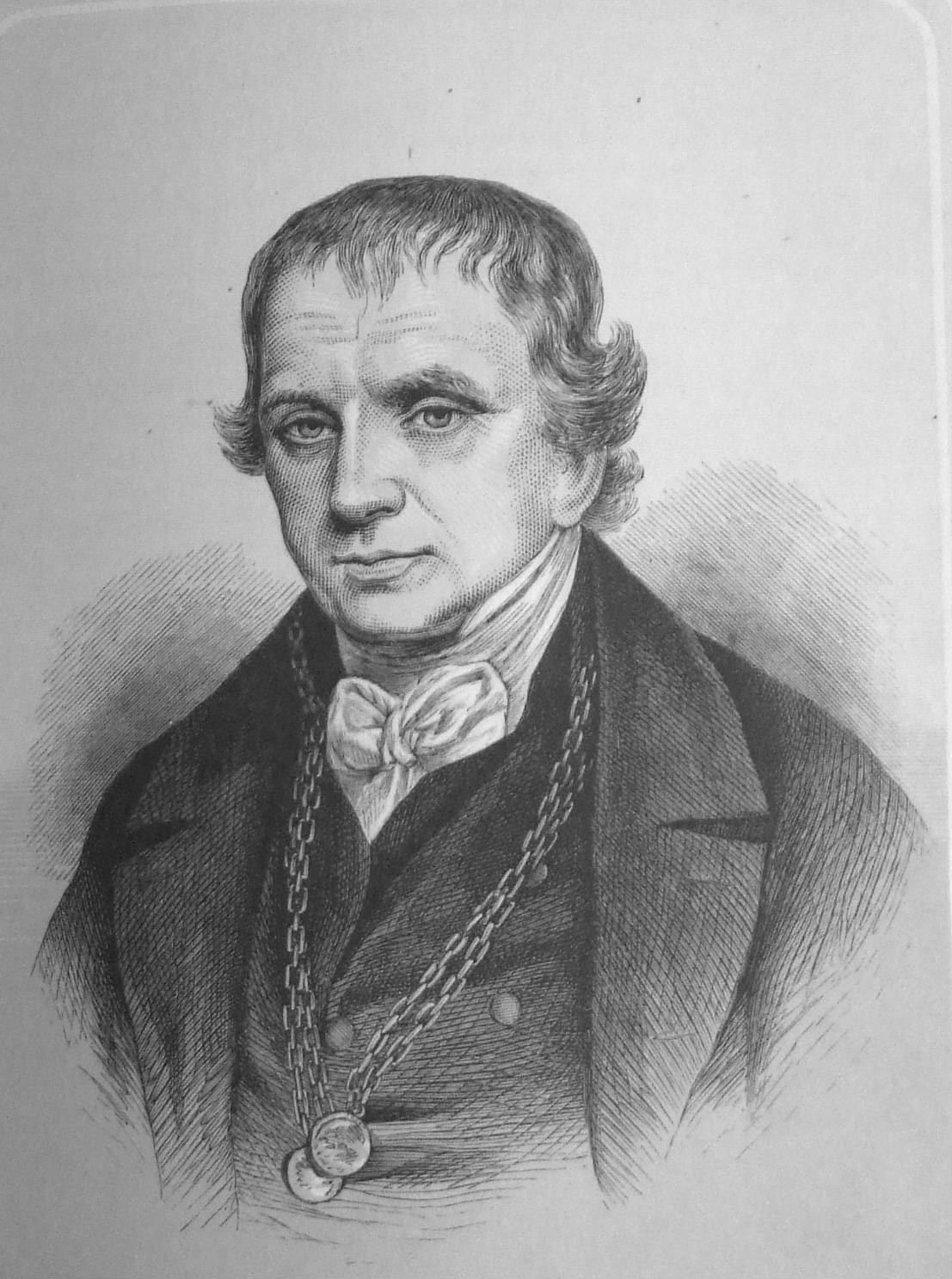
Dafydd Ddu Eryri

=== The Richards family ===
This group of manuscripts is related to the Welsh clerical family headed by the Rev. Thomas Richards (1754–1837), including his five ordained sons and three daughters, who were involved in church and cultural movements. The group of some 100 volumes includes part of the Llansilin Manuscripts, which date from the 17th and 18th centuries. There is also a group of transcripts and memoranda gathered by Mary Richards (1787-1877). Letters to members of the family are dispersed throughout the Cwrtmawr collection.

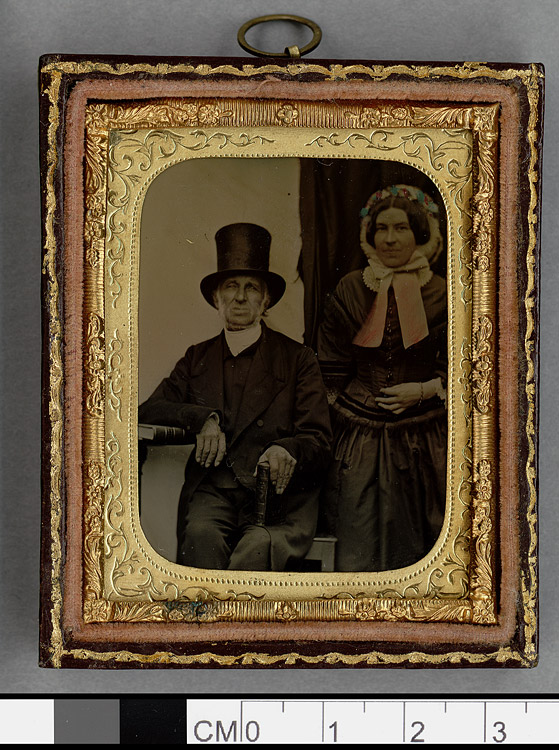
Richard Richards (1780–1860) and his granddaughter Elen Richards (1825–1864)

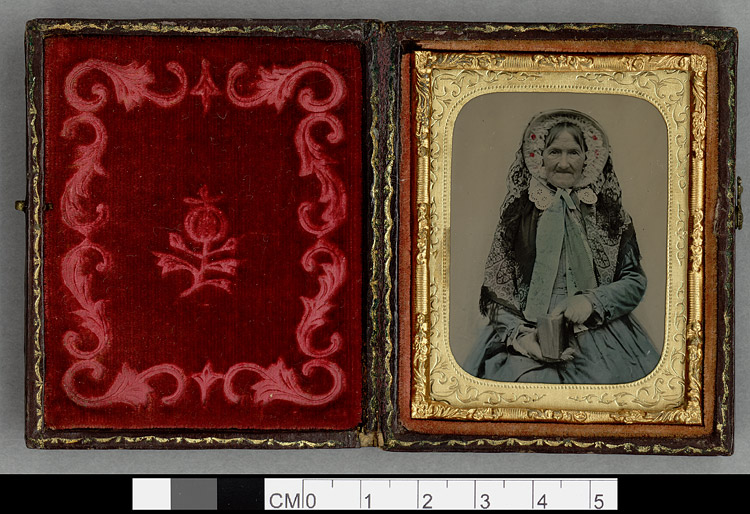
Mary (Mair) Richards (1787–1877)

=== The Williams ministers ===
This group is connected to the descendants of Rev. Peter Williams (1723–1796), and were primarily written or owned by Rev. Peter Bailey Williams (1763–1836) and Rev. St George Armstrong Williams (1804–1886). Some of the manuscripts, however, relate to the Rev. Peter Williams and his son, Rev. Eliezer Williams (1754–1820). There are manuscripts of literary and antiquarian interest in addition to the personal and family documents.

The manuscripts belonging to Rev. Peter Bailey Williams were widely dispersed after he died and John Humphreys Davies acquired them from a number of sources. The provenance of some is uncertain, but it is known that Davies acquired manuscripts from Miss L. Armstrong Williams and J. Glyn Davies, and some are thought to have come from Myrddin Fardd.

=== Gwilym Cowlyd ===
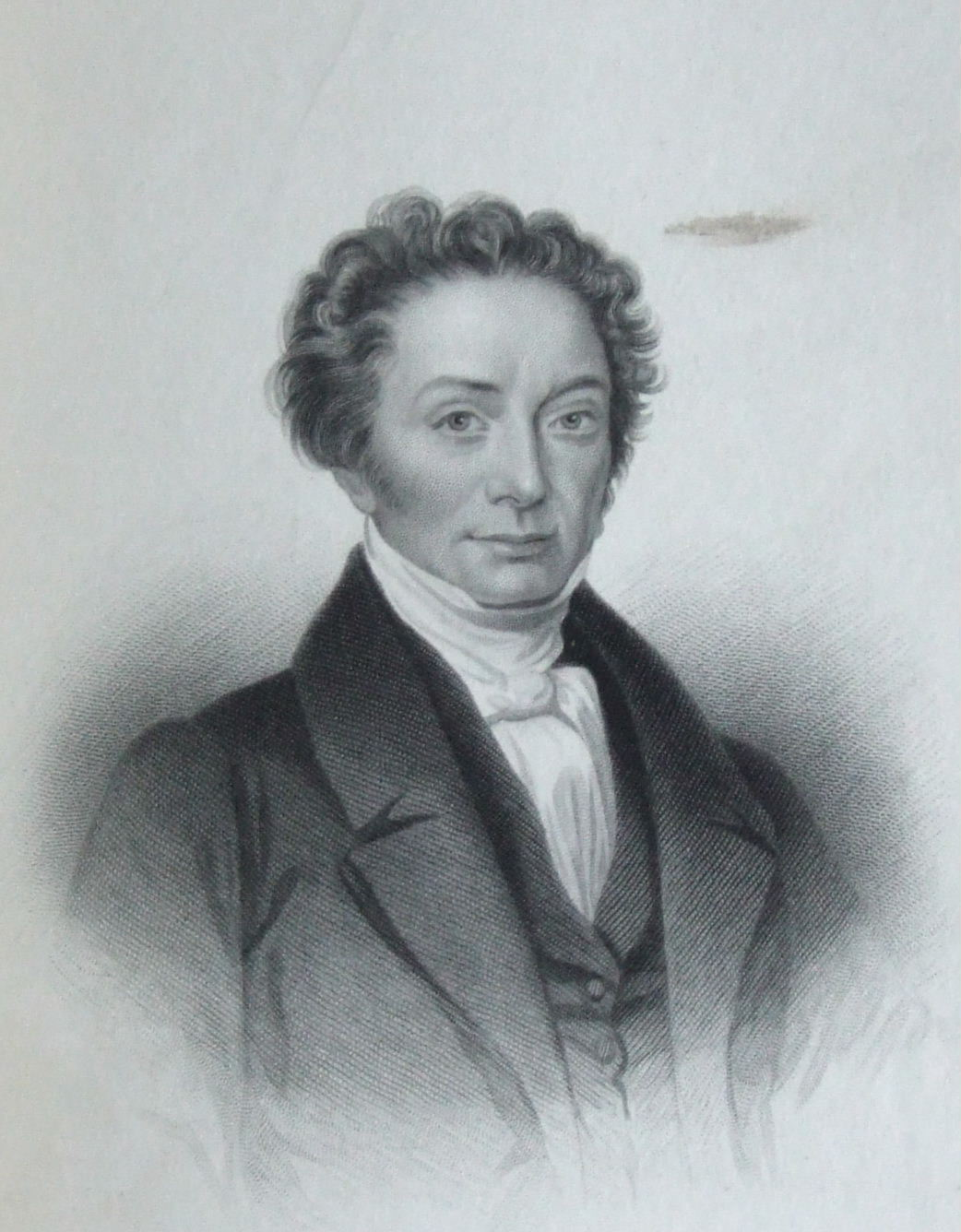
Ieuan Glan Geirionydd

The poet, printer, bookseller and bibliophile Gwilym Cowlyd (1828–1904) was the source of many of Davies's manuscripts and printed books, although there is uncertainty about the source of some, particularly Cwrtmawr Mss 33 and 42, which even Davies himself noted that he might have acquired from Gwilym Cowlyd. The group includes manuscripts personally connected with Gwilym Cowlyd and with his uncle, Rev. Evan Evans (Ieuan Glan Geirionydd), and also letters addressed to Gwilym Cowlyd and compilations of annotated press cuttings. There are a dozen manuscripts among them of David Evans, Llanrwst.

=== Rev. Daniel Silvan Evans ===
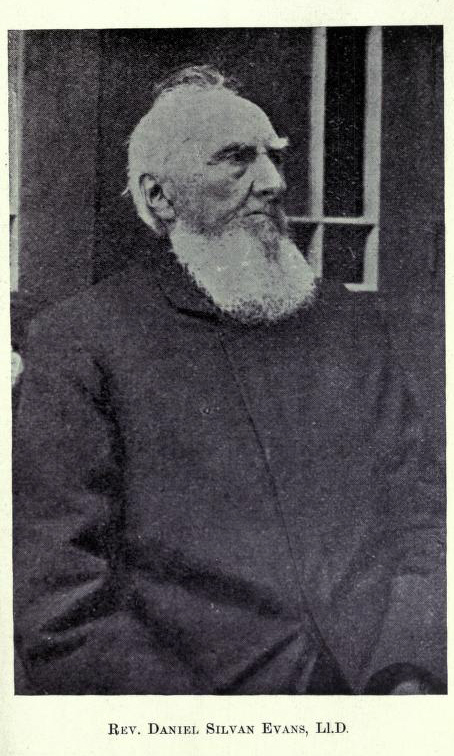
Rev. Daniel Silvan Evans

The library of Rev. Daniel Silvan Evans (1818-1903), had been neglected for many years before Davies bought it from his son, J. H. Silvan Evans. Most of the manuscripts relate to the literary and scholarly activities, and the lexicographical work in particular of Daniel Silvan Evans, with those of Rev. Robert Roberts (Y Sgolor Mawr) being of special lexicographical interest. There are a number of volumes of letters addressed to Evans, by scholars and literary men including John Rhys.
