= Alun Talfan Davies =

Welsh judge and politician (1913–2000)

Sir Alun Talfan Davies QC (22 July 1913 – 11 November 2000) was a Welsh judge, publisher and Liberal politician.

== Background ==
Alun Talfan Davies was born at Gorseinon near Swansea, the youngest son of the Calvinistic Methodist minister William Talfan Davies (1873–1938) and his wife Alys, née Jones (1878–1948). He was the brother of Aneirin Talfan Davies. He was educated at Gowerton grammar school. He read law at the University of Wales, Aberystwyth, and at Gonville and Caius College, Cambridge. In 1942, he married Eiluned Christopher Williams. He had one son and three daughters. In 1969 his daughter Janet married the Welsh Rugby international Barry John. He died at his home in Penarth on 1 November 2000.

== Legal career ==
Davies entered Gray's Inn and qualified as a barrister just before the outbreak of World War II. As a barrister he specialised in industrial cases and was retained by the National Union of Mineworkers. He was appointed as a QC in 1961.

Davies was a counsel to the public enquiry into Aberfan tip disaster of 1966. From 1967 to 1990 he was Chairman of the Trustees of the Aberfan Fund, which allocated the money raised by public subscription following the disaster.

During the trial of Mudiad Amddiffyn Cymru (lit. 'movement for the defence of Wales'; MAC) members John Barnard Jenkins and Frederick Ernest Alders in April 1970, Davies served as Alders' defence barrister.

Davies sat as a recorder (a part-time judge presiding at the Court of Quarter Sessions held for a borough) from 1963 to 1972 and as a full-time circuit judge from 1972 to 1986.

Legal appointments:

- Recorder of Merthyr Tydfil (1963–1968)
- Recorder of Swansea (1969)
- Recorder of Cardiff (1969–1971)
- Honorary Recorder of Cardiff and Recorder of the Crown Court (1972–1986)
- Criminal Injuries Compensation Board (1976–1985)
- Court of Appeal, Jersey and Guernsey (1969–1983)

== Political activity ==
During the 1930s, Davies had been a member of Plaid Cymru, but he left the party for the Liberal Party and became the chairman of the Liberal Party of Wales.

Davies stood four times for parliament without success. He was an independent candidate at the 1943 University of Wales by-election. At the 1959 general election he stood against Lady Megan Lloyd George in Carmarthen for the Liberals and again in 1964. In 1966 he switched to Denbigh but was once more unsuccessful.

Davies was a member of the Royal Commission on the Constitution from 1969 to 1973.

=== Electoral record ===
1943 University of Wales by-election
Party	Candidate	Votes	%	±%
Liberal	William John Gruffydd	3,098	52.3	−9.0
Plaid Cymru	John Saunders Lewis	1,330	22.5	N/A
Independent	Alun Talfan Davies	755	12.8	N/A
Independent Labour	Evan Davies	634	10.7	N/A
Independent Labour	Neville Lawrence Evans	101	1.7	N/A
Majority		1,768	29.8	+7.2
Turnout		5,918	53.4	−9.0
Liberal hold		Swing	N/A	

General Election 1959: Carmarthen
Party	Candidate	Votes	%	±%
Labour	Lady Megan Arfon Lloyd George	23,399	47.9	+5.16
Liberal	Alun Talfan Davies	16,766	34.3	−15.2
Conservative	JB Evans	6,147	12.6	n/a
Plaid Cymru	Hywel Heulyn Roberts	2,545	5.2	−6.3
Majority		6,633	13.6	+6.8
Turnout		48,857	85.4	+0.3
Labour hold		Swing	+10.2	

General Election 1964: Carmarthen
Party	Candidate	Votes	%	±%
Labour	Lady Megan Arfon Lloyd George	21,424	45.5	−2.4
Liberal	Alun Talfan Davies	15,210	32.3	−2.0
Plaid Cymru	Gwynfor Richard Evans	5,495	11.7	+6.4
Conservative	Mrs. HE Protheroe-Beynon	4,996	10.6	−2.0
Majority		6,214	13.2	−0.4
Turnout		47,122	84.4	−0.9
Labour hold		Swing	-0.2	

General Election 1966: Denbigh
Party	Candidate	Votes	%	±%
Conservative	William Geraint Oliver Morgan	17,382	39.4	−1.9
Liberal	Alun Talfan Davies	12,725	28.9	−1.8
Labour	Edward Griffiths	11,305	25.6	+5.5
Plaid Cymru	Gwilym Meredith Edwards	2,695	6.1	−1.8
Majority		4,657	10.6	−0.1
Turnout		44,107	80.61	+0.1
Conservative hold		Swing	-0.05	

== Cultural activities ==
In 1940, with his brother Aneirin Talfan Davies, Davies founded the Welsh language publishing firm Llyfrau'r Dryw (later taken over by Sir Alun's son, Christopher Davies and taking his name). In 1958 they co-published Y Geiriadur Mawr, an influential Welsh dictionary. In 1969 they founded the current affairs magazine Barn.

With a group of friends and acquaintances Davies formed Harlech Television (later HTV) which made a successful bid for the Wales and West independent television franchise, displacing the incumbent TWW in 1967. Davies persuaded Lord Harlech to become chairman of HTV Group while Davies became vice-chairman. Davies was chairman of the Welsh board from 1967 to 1973.

Davies was an active supporter of the National Eisteddfod of Wales and was President of the Court from 1979 to 1982. He was a Member of the Aberystwyth Old Students' Association and served as President (1973-4).

In 1980 he co-founded the Welsh Portrait Sculpture Trust which commissioned a series of portrait busts of distinguished Welshmen from the sculptor Ivor Roberts-Jones. In 1982 he became a trustee of the Welsh Sculpture Trust which established an outdoor sculpture collection in Margam Country Park.

== Other appointments and honours ==
- Knighted (1976)
- Chairman of the Bank of Wales (1991–1995)

== Publication ==
- Davies, Alun Talfan (1959). The casualties of industry : a plea for justice for miners (First ed.). Llandybie, Carmarthenshire: Christoper Davies. OCLC 315843373.
- Davies, Alun Talfan (1959). The casualties of industry : a plea for justice for miners (Second ed.). Carmarthenshire: Radical Publication. OCLC 502402484.

Professional and academic associations
Preceded by Mati Rees	President of the Aberystwyth Old Students' Association; 1973–1974	Succeeded by Prof. D. W. T. Jenkins
