= George M. Ll. Davies =

Welsh pacifist and politician

George Maitland Lloyd Davies (30 April 1880 – 16 December 1949), born George Maitland Temple Davies, was a Welsh pacifist and Member of Parliament for the University of Wales constituency.

Davies was born in Peel Road, Sefton Park, Liverpool, grandson on his maternal side of a noted Welsh preacher, John Jones, Talysarn; his family was wealthy - his cousin was David Davies of Llandinam, a Welsh industrial and political magnate. At 24 he became secretary of a Liverpool bank; when his health demanded a temporary rest, he was sent with a large salary to a manager's post in Wrexham in 1908. He later sought a complete change and took up agricultural work, then in 1913 went on to be secretary of a housing scheme, the Welsh Planning and Housing Trust.

As a Liberal non-conformist, Davies disparaged the National Service League's demand for conscription, and believed the answer was to volunteer militarily, so he took an officer's commission in the Territorial Army with the Royal Welsh Fusiliers while working at Wrexham. By early 1914 he came to realise that military force was incompatible with his deepening Christian devotion, and resigned. At the end of 1914 he became full-time paid Assistant Secretary of the newly formed Fellowship of Reconciliation (FoR). A military service tribunal in 1916 allowed him conscientious objector exemption, conditional on Work of National Importance mediated through the Friends Ambulance Unit General Service section. He first worked in a FoR home for disturbed children, trying to put into practice his belief in the goodness of human nature. Then he went to work on sheep farms in the hills of Llŷn. However, he began regularly to preach pacifism in the market place, so his exemption was withdrawn. This meant he was sent a notice to report for military training; when he ignored that he was arrested by the civil police and taken before the magistrates, who handed him over to the military. For disobeying orders he was court-martialled (in a depot where he had previously commanded troops) and imprisoned in Wormwood Scrubs, London, and Winson Green, Birmingham, between 1917 and 1919. After the war he worked for a time at Gregynog, for the Misses Davies.

In 1923, Davies was elected Member of Parliament for the University of Wales constituency, as an Independent Christian Pacifist, but after the election took the Labour whip, although he never joined any political party. He was thus the only university MP to ever sit on the Labour benches. In 1924, standing again as an Independent Christian Pacifist candidate, he lost the seat to the Liberal Ernest Evans. Thereafter Davies became a Calvinistic Methodist (Presbyterian) minister, serving as pastor in Tywyn and Maethlon between 1926 and 1930. He left to take up work among the unemployed in Rhosllannerchrugog and Brynmawr, and then settled in the Quaker community at Maes-yr-Haf in the Rhondda Valley. In 1939 he became President of the pacifist organisation, Heddychwyr Cymru, closely associated with the Peace Pledge Union, of which he served as Chair 1946–1949.

In 1946, Davies settled in North Wales at Dolwyddelan, and he continued to preach outdoors despite deteriorating health. He suffered from depression throughout his life, and in 1949 he committed suicide in North Wales Mental Hospital, Denbigh. He was buried at Dolwyddelan.

Davies married on 5 February 1916, at Finchley, London, Leslie Eleanor Royde-Smith, sister of author Naomi Royde-Smith. The couple had a daughter, Jane Hedd.

Davies was the author of various books in Welsh, including Pererindod Heddwch and Profiadau Pellach, about his ministry, and Atgofion Talysarn about his family, and several volumes in English. A Pilgrimage of Peace was posthumously published in 1950. His brother, John Glyn Davies, was a poet and author.

== See also ==
- List of peace activists

Parliament of the United Kingdom
Preceded by Thomas Arthur Lewis	Member of Parliament for University of Wales; 1923–1924	Succeeded by Ernest Evans
