= Margaret Davies (writer) =

Welsh poet and manuscript collector, c. 1700–1778 or 1785

- Born: c. 1700; Coetgae-du, near Trawsfynydd, Waes
- Died: 1778 or 1785
- Other name: Marged Dafydd
- Occupations: Poet and literary collector

Margaret Davies or Marged Dafydd (c. 1700 – 1778 or 1785) was a Welsh poet and literary collector. As part of a large literary coterie in Wales, she wrote, copied, and exchanged poems in manuscript form. Her work led to the survival of many printed and handwritten poems in Welsh, which she collected in her commonplace books. Several of these poems, and the names and identities of their writers, have survived only in her copies.

== Biography ==
Davies was born in Coetgae-du, near Trawsfynydd in north-west Wales. She was tutored in poetry by her mother, Ann Dafydd (d. 1726).

Davies was one several north-western Welsh women poets, including Margaret Rowlands and Alis ach Wiliam, who travelled to meet with each other and trade poems. Like the pioneering poet Angharad James, born in the previous generation, those in this informal group were relatively privileged economically, with money and leisure time to make poetry writing and travel feasible. Davies never married or had children, but was financially comfortable through her family, allowing her to be more poetically prolific than many of her peers. In addition to her contacts in Snowdonia, Davies also corresponded with male poets of the London Celticism movement.

Davies died in 1778 or 1785.

== Poetry ==
Five manuscripts wholly in Davies's handwriting and three others to which she contributed are known to survive. Some are held in the Cwrtmawr Manuscripts collection at the National Library of Wales. They contain collections of poems organized by form, including awdlau, cywyddau, and cerddi. Half a dozen women poets are represented, with some poems surviving only in Davies's copies. For example, the compilations are the only known source for one of the englynion written by a medieval Welsh woman poet, Gwerful Mechain. Likewise, much surviving information on Angharad James, including the one known copy of James's elegy on her son's death, comes from Davies.

Davies was particularly interested in preserving older Welsh poetic forms, such as cynghanedd and englynion. She wrote in these forms, though no poems of hers were published in her lifetime.

According to the literary scholar Ceridwen Lloyd-Morgan, "The importance of [Davies's] contribution... cannot be over-emphasised: without her efforts in collecting and writing down poems by other women, both of her day and earlier, a significant number of poems, and even the names of the women who composed them, would be completely unknown to us today."
