= Buchedd Garmon =

1937 radio drama by Saunders Lewis

Buchedd Garmon is a radio drama in the Welsh language written by Saunders Lewis. The first broadcast was in 1937. The story portrays the visit of Garmon (known as Germanus of Auxerre in the English language) to Britain in 429. In his preface to the drama, the dramatist describes it as an experiment in a vers libre natural speaking drama ("arbrawf mewn vers libre i ddrama siarad naturiol.").

== Background ==
Saunders Lewis wrote the drama after the failure of a jury to agree on a verdict in his first trial for burning the Penyberth bombing school, while waiting for the second trial in London. By the time the drama had been broadcast, the author was already in jail on 2 March 1937.

== Summary ==
The drama begins with Illtud and Paulinus arriving at Auxerre. They ask Garmon to travel to Britain to oppose the heresy of Pelagianism, which is spreading under the influence of the preacher Agricola. Garmon and Lupus, bishops of Troyes, agree to travel to Britain. Garmon overcomes the Pelagians in a public debate and performs a miracle by giving sight to a blind child. King Emrys Wledig (Ambrosius Aurelianus in English) meets Garmon and asks for his help on defending against an army of Picts and Saxons. Under the leadership of Garmon, the Britons shout "Hallelujah", frightens them, and wins the battle.

== Quotation ==
The most quoted and recognised part of the drama is the passage with the request for help from Garmon, spoken by Emrys Wledig:

Gwinllan a roddwyd i'm gofal yw Cymru fy ngwlad,
i'w thraddodi i'm plant, ac i blant fy mhlant,
yn dreftadaeth dragwyddol.
Ac wele'r moch yn rhuthro arni, i'w maeddu.
Minnau yn awr, galwaf ar fy nghyfeillion,
cyffredin ac ysgolhaig,
Deuwch ataf i'r adwy,
Sefwch gyda mi yn y bwlch,
fel y cadwer i'r oesoedd a ddel y glendid a fu.

=== Translation ===
My country of Wales is a vineyard, given into my keeping,
to be handed down to my children and my children's children,
as an inheritance for all time.
And look, the pigs are rushing in to despoil it.
I in this hour, call upon my friends,
the ordinary and scholarly,
Come to my rescue,
Stand with me in the gap,
so the cleanliness of ages past is kept for ages to come

== Bibliography ==
The drama was first published by Aberystwyth Press in 1937, accompanied by the music drama Mair Fadlen.
