= J. Glyn Davies =

Celtic language scholar, songwriter and poet (1870–1953)

John Glyn Davies (22 October 1870 – 11 November 1953) was a Welsh scholar, poet and songwriter, most of whose creative writing is in the Welsh language. His songs for children, often in the form of sea shanties, remain very popular in Wales. He was also the first librarian of the institution which eventually became the National Library of Wales. He has been described as "one of the most remarkable figures of his age".

== Ancestry and early life ==
Davies was born at 55 Peel St., Sefton Park, Liverpool, his parents being John Davies, a tea merchant, and Gwen Davies (née Jones), daughter of the famous Methodist preacher John Jones, Talysarn. John Jones himself had two different lines of descent from Angharad James, the early 18th century poet and harpist. One of John Glyn Davies' younger brothers was the politician and peace activist George Maitland Lloyd Davies. He was educated at the Liverpool Institute, but during holidays from school the family many times visited the Llŷn Peninsula, especially the village of Edern where Davies' paternal grandfather lived. There, and in his native city, he gained his love of ships and the sea.

On leaving school he worked successively for Rathbone Brothers (1887–1892), The Cambrian Shipping Company (1892–1895), Henry Tate and Sons (1895–1896), and the Mines Corporation of New Zealand (1896–1898). This gained him considerable experience of life in sailing ships.

== Career as a librarian and scholar ==
In 1899 he was appointed the first librarian of "the Welsh Library", the nucleus of the future National Library of Wales, in one room at the University College of Wales, Aberystwyth. His annual salary was set at £50, but a disagreement with his employers about the payment of it provoked Davies to burn the library catalogue he had compiled.

In 1907 he transferred to the library of the University of Liverpool. From the University library Davies transferred again to the Celtic Department, where he became an assistant lecturer. In 1920, on the retirement of Kuno Meyer, Davies took over as head of department, and continued in this post until his retirement in 1936. His publications included a book on Welsh Metrics (1911) and papers on the history of the Welsh Roma. Though Davies made a promising start in scholarship his later works have been described as "erratic and uneven".

== Creative writing ==
Davies is today best known for his three volumes of children's songs, Cerddi Huw Puw (1922), Cerddi Robin Goch (1935) and Cerddi Portinllaen (1936). His most popular productions in this line include "Fflat Huw Puw", which has been called "one of the quintessential Welsh songs of all time", the Christmas song "Pwy sy'n dwad dros y bryn?", "Gwen a Mair ac Elin" and "Bwrw Glaw yn Sobor lawn". Many of these songs were in the form of sea shanties with words by Davies himself and melodies either composed by Davies or adapted by him from genuine shanties he had heard in his youth from his brother Frank and from Caernarfonshire sailors. Davies's shanties are now sometimes incorrectly described as traditional by modern folk performers.

A book of poems, Cerddi Edern a cherddi ereill (published posthumously in 1955), includes acerbic satirical verses and many lyrics which, in the judgement of the critic R. Geraint Gruffydd, "will undoubtedly live". In collaboration with D. E. Jenkins he also translated Ibsen's The Pretenders into Welsh as Yr Ymhonwyr (1922).

== Personal life ==
He married Hettie Williams on 18 July 1908, and they had one son and three daughters. During Davies's career at Liverpool University they lived at Mostyn and Denbigh; after his retirement they lived at Cambridge, Llandegfan, Llannarth, and finally Llanfairfechan.
