= John Jones, Talysarn =

Welsh Calvinistic Methodist minister

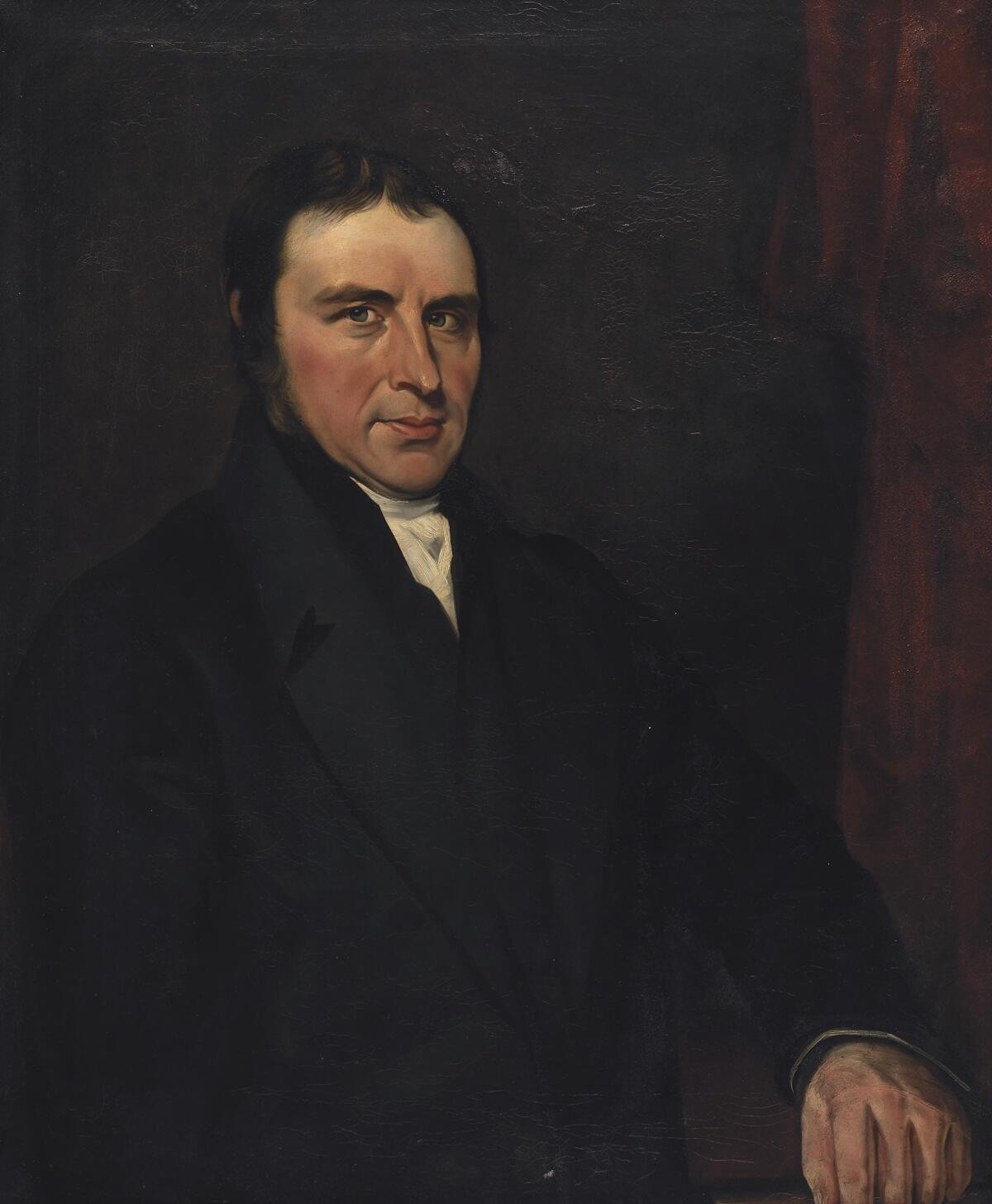
Portrait by William Williams (Ap Caledfryn), 1870, National Library of Wales

John Jones, Talysarn (1 March 1796 – 16 August 1857), was a Welsh Calvinistic Methodist minister, regarded as one of the greatest preachers in the history of Wales. Because the name "John Jones" was one of the most common in Wales at the time, he is usually differentiated by others of the same name by the use of the suffix "Talysarn", denoting the village where he lived.

== Life ==
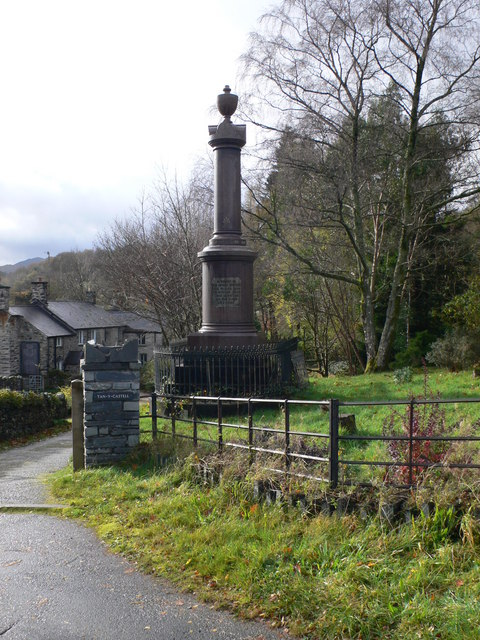
Memorial at Tan-y-castell to John Jones and his brothers David (1805–1868), William (1801–1885) and Richard (1799–1850), "three ministers and one elder"

John Jones was born in a house called Tan-y-castell, in Dolwyddelan, and brought up in a farming family but which also had many connections with Nonconformist religion. He was a monoglot Welsh speaker, and the only formal education he received was at the Sabbath school.

As a young man around 1820 he was engaged as a labourer building Thomas Telford's road from London to Holyhead (now known as the A5), and was heard by his fellow workers preaching on religious matters as he walked to work. In 1822 he moved to Talysarn to find work in the quarry, but was increasingly devoting himself to preaching. He was ordained in 1829, and would become widely known by the name "John Jones, Talysarn", after his adopted home village.

He married Frances (Fanny) Edwards around this time and left the quarry as they kept a shop together – although in practice it was she who understood business and kept the shop, so that he could devote time to matters of religion.

Between 1850 and 1852 he was a joint owner of the Dorothea Quarry but did not like this occupation.

He died on 16 August 1857 and was buried at the parish graveyard in Llanllyfni. In the funeral procession were 8 doctors, 65 ministers, 70 deacons, 200 choristers and around 4,000 others with a further 2,000 who joined en route.

== His work ==
In an age when Nonconformist preaching had been riven by doctrinal differences, John Jones spoke plainly on matters that concerned the common people. They considered him one of their own, which was the foundation of his widespread appeal. Martyn Lloyd-Jones described him as "a thorough gospel man", and found him very influential.

He was also a singer, and composed the hymn tune Llanllyfni.

== Genealogy ==
John Jones was a member of a large family which has gone to some trouble, before and since, to record its genealogy. Both his father and mother were descended from the poet Angharad James. In the mid-nineteenth century several of his brothers and sisters and their offspring emigrated to the area around Cambria, Wisconsin, United States.

== Bibliography ==
- W. R. Ambrose (1871), Hynafiaethau, Cofiannau a Hanes Presennol Nant Nantlle, y Traethawd Buddugol yn Eisteddfod Gadeiriol Pen-y-groes
- Cledwyn Jones (2003), Mi Wisga'i Gap Pig Gloyw, John Glyn Davies, 1870–1953 Gwasg Pantycelyn ISBN 1-903314-56-9
- O. Llew Owain (1907), Cofiant Mrs Fanny Jones, gweddw y diweddar Barch. J. Jones, Talysarn cyhoeddwyd gan Mrs Jones, Cambrian House, Machynlleth.
- Griffith Owen (1896), Cadwaladr Owen, Hughes and Son, Wrexham
- G. T. Roberts, John Jones Tal-y-Sarn (1796–1857), Trafodion Cymdeithas Hanes Sir Gaernarfon, cyfrol 18 (1957)
- Owen Thomas, D.D. (1874), Cofiant y Parchedig John Jones, Talsarn, Wrexham
