= Saunders Lewis =

Welsh writer and politician (1893–1985)

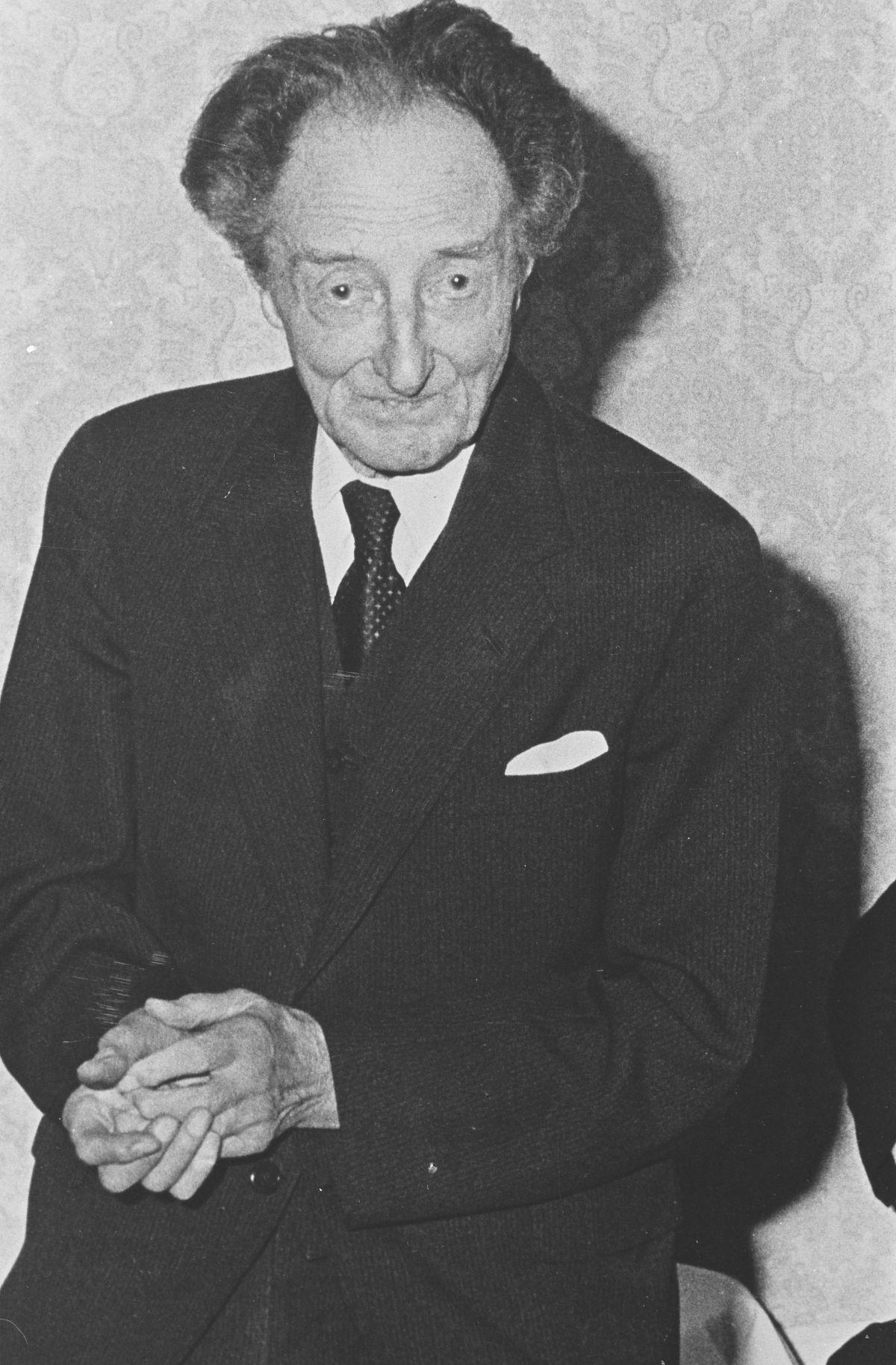
- Saunders Lewis in 1973

President of Plaid Cymru
- In office 1926–1939
- Preceded by: Lewis Valentine
- Succeeded by: John Edward Daniel

Personal details
- Born: John Saunders Lewis; 15 October 1893 Wallasey, Cheshire, England
- Died: 1 September 1985 (aged 91) Cardiff, Wales
- Party: Plaid Cymru
- Spouse: Margaret Gilcriest (m. 1924; died 1984)
- Children: 1
- Education: University of Liverpool

Military service
- Branch/service: British Army
- Years of service: 1914-1919
- Rank: Lieutenant
- Unit: King's Liverpool Regiment; South Wales Borderers
- Battles/wars: World War I; Western Front; Battle of Cambrai

Saunders Lewis (born John Saunders Lewis; 15 October 1893 – 1 September 1985) was a Welsh politician, poet, dramatist, Medievalist, and literary critic. Born into a Welsh-speaking ministerial family in Greater Liverpool, Lewis rediscovered the importance of both his heritage language and cultural roots while serving as a junior officer in the British Army during the trenches of the First World War. As a vocal supporter of Welsh nationalism, Lewis believed, however, that heritage language revival, cultural nationalism, the dramatic arts, and culture needed to precede Welsh devolution or political independence. If the excessive Anglophilia and colonial mentality traditionally known as Dic Siôn Dafydd was never challenged or defeated, Lewis predicted in 1918, "the Welsh Parliament would [only] be an enlarged County Council."

Lewis accordingly became a co-founder of Plaid Genedlaethol Cymru (The National Party of Wales), now the Welsh nationalist political party known as Plaid Cymru, at a covert meeting with fellow nationalists during the 1925 National Eisteddfod of Wales. Lewis has been described by Jan Morris as, "the most passionate of twentieth century Welsh patriots", and as being, "one of the few twentieth century writers in Welsh with a European reputation, but for many Welshmen [he was] chiefly the keeper of the national conscience." Lewis is usually acknowledged as one of the most vitally important figures in 20th-century Welsh-language literature. He is also widely credited, through his 1962 radio address Tynged yr Iaith ("The Fate of the Language"), with almost singlehandedly bringing Welsh back from the brink of language death.

In 1970, Lewis was nominated for a Nobel Prize in Literature and was appointed as a Knight Commander of the Order of St Gregory by Pope Paul VI. Saunders Lewis' traditionalist Catholic and distributist beliefs gave him a simultaneously anti-Marxist and anti-colonialist interpretation of Welsh history and a similar vision, influenced by his study of what had he considered to have worked in Irish nationalism, for the future of the Welsh people. Lewis was voted the tenth greatest Welsh hero in the '100 Welsh Heroes' poll, released on St. David's Day 2004.

== Early life ==
John Saunders Lewis was born into a Welsh-speaking family in Wallasey in the Wirral, Cheshire, in the north-west of England, on 15 October 1893. He was the second of three sons of Lodwig Lewis (1859–1933), a Calvinistic Methodist minister, and his wife Mary Margaret (née Thomas, 1862–1900). When he was only six years old, Lewis's mother died and his unmarried maternal "Aunt Ellen" (Ellen Elizabeth Thomas) moved into the manse and helped to raise him.

Jan Morris has described Liverpool as the closest there is to a metropolis for the people of North Wales. During a television interview with Aneirin Talfan Davies, Lewis later recalled that this was also true during his childhood, as in and around Liverpool, "there were around about a hundred thousand Welsh-speaking Welsh people... So I was not born in English-speaking England... but into a society that was completely Welsh and Welsh-speaking."

Even though his father was a scholar, "who liked solitude and study", and possessed a very large library of Welsh literature, the only Welsh-language books that Saunders Lewis read while growing up were Bishop Morgan's Bible, the hymnbook, and Sunday school commentaries.

Lewis attended prestigious English-speaking Liscard High School for Boys where he was bullied at first, due to the fact that what little English he could speak, "was full of Welsh words." In time, however, Lewis became, "a typical product of the English education system." He became editor of The Liscard High School Magazine and often visited the Wallasey Public Library, where he read contemporary English literature and, as a teenager, was enthusiastic when he discovered the recent mythopoeic poetry and prose reimaginings of Irish folklore and mythology by Irish nationalists William Butler Yeats, John Millington Synge, and Padraic Colum.

Lewis later recalled that through these writers, "I came for the first time to understand what patriotism meant and the spirit of the nation meant. And I soon began to think that things like those, which had seized hold of them in Ireland, were the things I should seize hold of in Wales."

Lewis' earliest attempts at writing poems were in English and were inspired by William Wordsworth, Walter Pater, John Wesley and the King James Bible.

== Personal life ==
After entering Liverpool University to study English literature in 1911, Lewis is believed to have first met fellow student Margaret Gilcriest, a Roman Catholic from County Wicklow and staunch believer in Irish political and cultural nationalism, in December 1913. Lewis and Gilcriest shared an enthusiasm for literature and in their subsequent courtship by letters, all of which have since been published, there are references to the writings of Dora Sigerson, Katherine Tynan, James Clarence Mangan, Alice Meynell, Emily Lawless, Tom Kettle, Daniel Corkery, and James Joyce.

After his aunt Ellen persuaded his father "to accept the inevitable", Lewis and Margaret Gilcriest (1891-1984) were married at Our Lady and St Michael Roman Catholic Church in Workington, Cumberland, on 31 July 1924. They had one child, a daughter.

== First World War ==
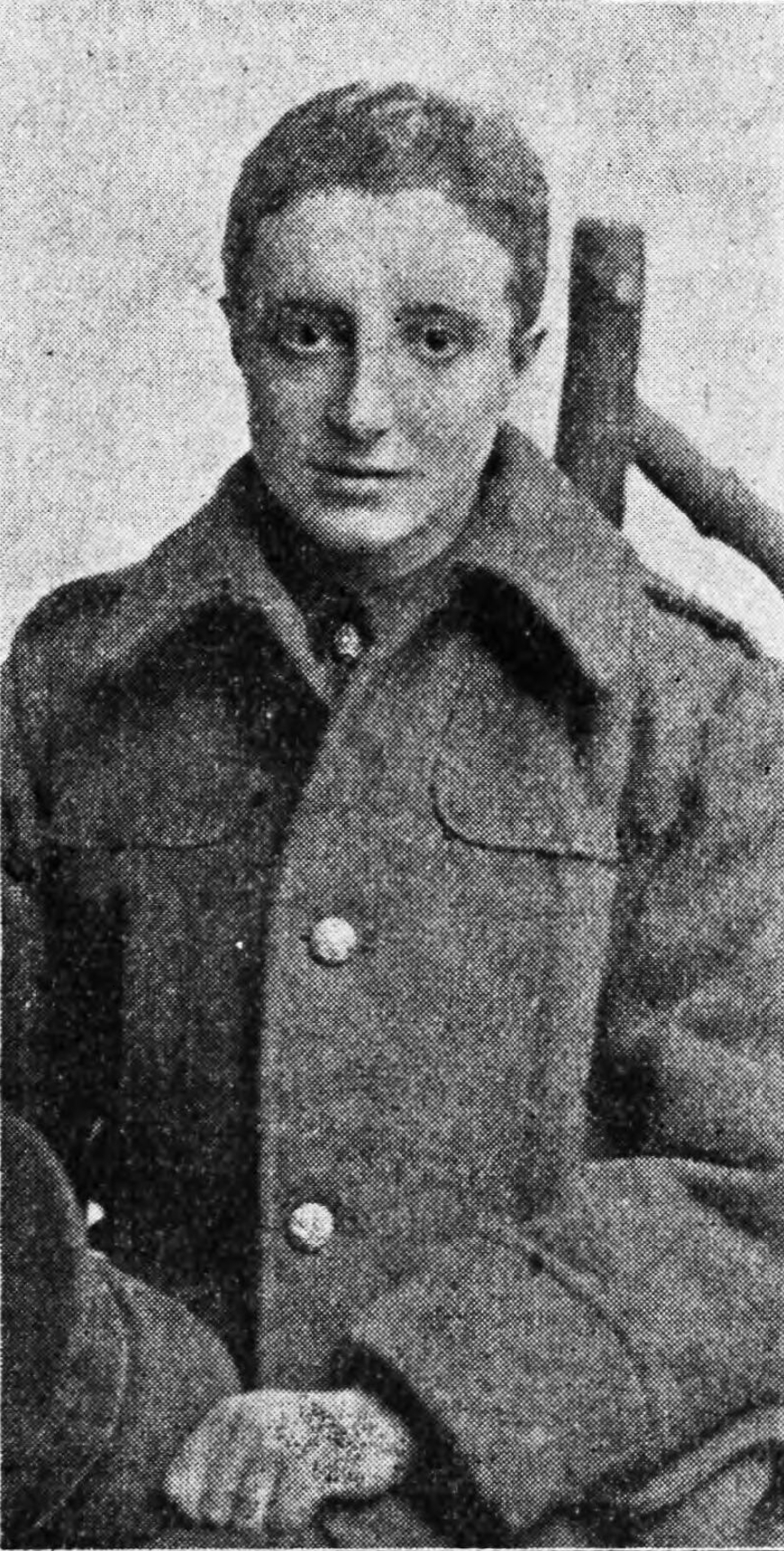
Saunders Lewis while an officer in the British Army, 3 February 1916

When the First World War broke out, an idealistic Lewis, feeling inspired by the Aesthete philosophy of Walter Pater to, "savour this experience of life-energy at the utmost", enlisted in the 3rd Battalion, King's Liverpool Regiment on 4 September 1914. British Army records describe Lewis at the time as five-feet and three inches in height, weighing just over seven and a half stone, and as having red hair and grey eyes.

In April 1915, Lewis applied for a commission with the South Wales Borderers and was promoted to full lieutenant in February 1916. The following summer, he was deployed to active service on the Western Front.

During the war, Lewis read the trilogy of novels The Cult of the Self (French: Le Culte du moi) by the French writer Maurice Barrès. Barrès, a French nationalist, had called since the 1890s, alongside Paul Claudel and Paul Bourget, for, "a 'return' to national values and traditions." This volume heavily influenced Lewis' growing sense of his own Welsh identity and belief in the vital importance of cultural nationalism.

Furthermore, according to Jelle Krol, Lewis, was amazed to see how his own father's recent words of advice were echoed by Barrès, who wrote, "the only way to cultivate your personality as an artist and to develop your own resources, is to go back to your roots". Lewis accordingly, "discovered the importance of his Welsh roots during his service in France."

In April 1917, Lewis was severely wounded in action in the left leg and thigh near Gonnelieu, with, "the calf of the leg nearly blown away", as part of the Battle of Cambrai. Afterwards, Lewis needed more than a year to convalesce, during which his younger brother, Ludwig Lewis, was killed in action on 7 July 1917. Although Lewis desperately wanted to visit and help comfort their grieving father at Swansea, his own battlefield injuries were still far too severe to permit him to travel.

In a 23 July 1918 letter to The Cambria Daily Leader, Lewis, as he would do for the remainder of his life, explained why he felt cultural nationalism needed to precede political decolonisation, "In Wales, if we gave ourselves less to party politics and more to the development of our own education and culture, we should make Wales more fitted to have an independent life of her own under Home Rule. And Home Rule, before we have a real national spirit, would mean simply that the Welsh Parliament would be an enlarged County Council."

== Return to Wales ==
After his return from the trenches, Lewis entered the literary field by arguing that three conditions needed to be met for Welsh literature to become truly meaningful. Firstly, "a more professional attitude to Welsh drama". Secondly, the reestablishment of a direct link between Welsh culture with that of mainland Europe, and particularly with French culture, and, lastly, a more continual religious and cultural exploration of pre-Reformation Wales by Welsh writers and intellectuals.

In a 22 October 1919 letter to The Cambria Daily Leader, called for a revival of drama in the Welsh language, beginning with the improvement of dramas set in the villages, "All the plays we have seen so far describe, and rather idyllically describe, village manners. But village life is more than 'manners'. It includes memories and traditions and song and even dance and mummery. Village and peasant drama, if it should tell the round truth, must include romance, the Mabinogion, the monastery, witchcraft, fairyland, and all the ancient playgrounds of men. Let us widen our field."

In a letter of 25 October 1919 to the same newspaper, Lewis urged Welsh-language playwrights and the theatre going public to both, "take note of the dramatic history of Europe." Lewis continued, "And so it seems to me we should begin anew with translation. We should translate into Welsh the plays of the acknowledged masters, of Euripides, of Corneille, of Racine, of Moliere, of Ibsen, of the Spaniards, and we should act them continually; we should learn the classics."

In 1922, he was appointed as lecturer in Welsh literature at the University College of Wales, Swansea. During his time at Swansea he produced some of his most significant works of literary criticism: A School of Welsh Augustans (1924), Williams Pantycelyn (1927), and Braslun o hanes llenyddiaeth Gymraeg (An outline history of Welsh literature) (1932). He continued in this post until his dismissal for a political act of arson at Penyberth, Gwynedd, in 1936.

== Founding Plaid Cymru ==
Discussions of the need for a "Welsh party" had been conducted since the 19th century. With the generation or so before 1922 there "had been a marked growth in the constitutional recognition of the Welsh nation", wrote historian John Davies. By 1924 there were people in Wales "eager to make their nationality the focus of Welsh politics". Lewis's experiences in World War I, and his sympathy for the cause of Irish independence, brought him to Welsh nationalism. He was an advocate for Welsh independence.

In 1924, Lewis founded Y Mudiad Cymreig ("The Welsh Movement") with a small group of fellow nationalists. The group met secretly for the first time in Penarth on 7 January 1924. The group continued to meet in secret throughout 1924 and began drawing up a set of aims and policies intended to "rescue Wales from political and cultural oblivion".

At around the same time as Lewis formed Y Mudiad Cymreig, another group of nationalists formed Byddin Ymreolwyr Cymru ("The Welsh Home Rule Army") in Caernarfon. The group was led by Huw Robert Jones, who made contact with Lewis in early 1925 and proposed to form a new political party.

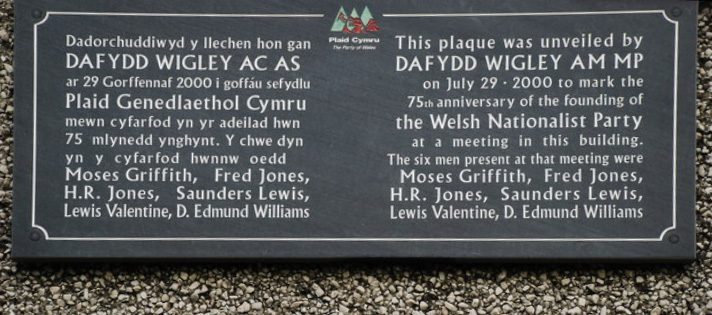
A plaque was inaugurated to mark the 75th anniversary of Plaid Cymru's founding meeting in 2000 on the building where the meeting took place in Pwllheli

Lewis met with Jones, Lewis Valentine, Moses Griffith, Fred Jones and D. Edmund Williams in a café called Maes Gwyn during the 1925 National Eisteddfod in Pwllheli, Gwynedd, with the aim of establishing a "Welsh party". They founded Plaid Genedlaethol Cymru ("National Party of Wales"), on 5 August 1925. The principal aim of the party would be to foster a Welsh-speaking Wales. To this end it was agreed that party business be conducted in Welsh, and that members sever all links with other British parties. Lewis insisted on these principles before he would agree to the Pwllheli conference.

According to the 1911 census, out of a population of just under 2.5 million, 43.5% of the total population of Wales spoke Welsh as a primary language. This was a decrease from the 1891 census with 54.4% speaking Welsh out of a population of 1.5 million. With these pre-requisites, Lewis condemned "'Welsh nationalism' as it had hitherto existed, a nationalism characterized by inter-party conferences, an obsession with Westminster and a willingness to accept a subservient position for the Welsh language", wrote Davies. It may be because of these strict positions that the party failed to attract politicians of experience in its early years. However, the party's members believed its founding was an achievement in itself; "merely by existing, the party was a declaration of the distinctiveness of Wales", wrote Davies.

== The Lewis Doctrine 1926–1939 ==
During the inter-war years, Plaid Genedlaethol Cymru was most successful as a social and educational pressure group rather than as a political party. For Saunders Lewis, party president 1926 to 1939, "the chief aim of the party [is] to 'take away from the Welsh their sense of inferiority ... to remove from our beloved country the mark and shame of conquest.'" Lewis sought to cast Welshness into a new context, wrote Davies.

Lewis wished to demonstrate how Welsh heritage was linked as one of the 'founders' of European civilization. Lewis, a self-described "strong monarchist", wrote "Civilization is more than an abstraction. It must have a local habitation and name. Here its name is Wales." Additionally, Lewis strove for the stability, educational and cultural advancement, and economic prosperity of local communities in Y Fro Gymraeg. He also denounced both laissez faire capitalism and Marxism, and instead promoted what he called perchentyaeth (lit. "house-ownership") meaning "distributing property among the masses", based on Catholic social teaching, Distributism, and Christian democracy.

== Broadcasting ==
Saunders Lewis perceived the early development of BBC radio broadcasting in Wales (which was almost entirely in English) as serious threat to his aim of arresting the decline of the Welsh language (then down to 36%) and turning Wales back into a 100% Welsh-speaking nation. At the same time he also recognised that if he could exert influence and pressure on the BBC, the Corporation could become a useful tool to serve Plaid Cymru's political ends. In 1929 he declared it would soon be necessary to arrange for "thousands of Welshmen to be prosecuted for refusing to pay for English programmes". The following year Lewis was commissioned by E.R. Appleton, Director of the BBC's Cardiff radio station, (who had banned broadcasting in Welsh) to broadcast a talk which would "explain Welsh Nationalism". On vetting the script, which advocated political nationalism in preference to "cultural nationalism", Appleton decided it was too controversial and inflammatory to be broadcast. In October 1933 the University of Wales Council, which had been lobbying for more Welsh-language broadcasting, appointed a ten-man council to press the case with the BBC. It included David Lloyd George, William George, W. J. Gruffydd and Saunders Lewis – who was continuing to incense the BBC by publicly alleging it was "seeking the destruction of the Welsh language". The University Committee, which was described by BBC Director General John Reith as "the most unpleasant and unreliable people with whom it has been my misfortune to deal" gained ever more influence on the BBC in Wales not least in the selection of BBC staff – a function delegated to the committee by the corporation. As newspapers of the time noted, appointees seemed primarily drawn from the families of the Welsh-speaking elite including "the son of a professor of Welsh and the offspring of three archdruids". Saunders Lewis's assiduous campaigning over the years was to succeed in cementing an ongoing Plaid Cymru influence within the BBC. When the BBC's Welsh Advisory Council was eventually established in 1946, although half its members were Labour, several Plaid Cymru supporters were appointed including Saunders Lewis's successor as Plaid Cymru president, Gwynfor Evans.

== Tân yn Llŷn 1936 ==
Welsh nationalism was ignited in 1936 when the UK Government settled on establishing an RAF training camp and aerodrome at Penyberth on the Llŷn Peninsula in Gwynedd. The events surrounding the protest, known as Tân yn Llŷn ("Fire in Llŷn"), helped define Plaid Genedlaethol Cymru. The UK Government settled on Llŷn as the site for its training camp after similar proposed sites in Northumberland and Dorset met with protests.

However, Prime Minister Stanley Baldwin refused to hear the case against building this "bombing school" in Wales, despite a deputation representing 500,000 Welsh protesters. Protest against the project was summed up by Lewis when he wrote that the UK Government was intent upon turning one of the "essential homes of Welsh culture, idiom, and literature" into a place for promoting a "barbaric" method of warfare. Construction of this military academy began exactly 400 years after the passage of the Laws in Wales Acts 1535 and 1542.

On 8 September 1936, the building was set on fire and in the investigations which followed Saunders Lewis, Lewis Valentine, and D. J. Williams claimed responsibility. They were tried at Caernarfon, where the jury failed to agree on a verdict. The case was then sent to be retried at the Old Bailey in London, where "the Three" were convicted, and sentenced to nine months imprisonment. On their release from Wormwood Scrubs, they were greeted as heroes by 15,000 Welsh people at a pavilion in Caernarfon.

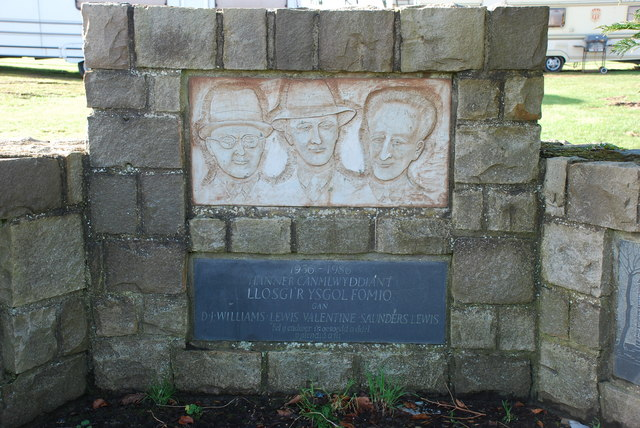
Memorial to the Tân yn Llŷn protest in Penyberth. Saunders Lewis is the figure depicted on the right of the monument.

Many Welsh people were angered by the judge's scornful treatment of the Welsh language, by the decision to move the trial to London, and by the decision of University College, Swansea, to dismiss Lewis from his post before he had been found guilty. Dafydd Glyn Jones wrote of the fire that it was "the first time in five centuries that Wales struck back at England with a measure of violence... To the Welsh people, who had long ceased to believe that they had it in them, it was a profound shock."

However, despite the acclaim the events of Tân yn Llŷn generated, by 1938 Lewis's concept of perchentyaeth ("home ownership") had been firmly rejected as not a fundamental tenet of the party. In 1939 Lewis resigned as Plaid Genedlaethol Cymru president, saying that Wales was not ready to accept the leadership of a Roman Catholic.

Although Lewis was the son and grandson of prominent Welsh Calvinistic Methodist ministers, he had converted to Roman Catholicism in 1932.

== Second World War ==
Lewis maintained a strict neutrality in his writings through his column Cwrs y Byd in Y Faner. It was his attempt at an unbiased interpretation of the causes and events of the war.

Outside of the party's initial position on the war, party members were free to choose for themselves their level of support for the war effort. Plaid Genedlaethol Cymru was officially neutral regarding involvement the Second World War, which Lewis and other leaders considered a continuation of the First World War. Central to the neutrality policy was the idea that Wales, as a nation, had the right to decide independently on its attitude towards war, along with opposition towards the UK government's decision to involve Wales in the conflict. With this challenging and revolutionary policy Lewis hoped a significant number of Welshmen would refuse to join the armed forces.

Lewis and other party members were attempting to strengthen loyalty to the Welsh nation "over the loyalty to the British State". Lewis argued "The only proof that the Welsh nation exists is that there are some who act as if it did exist."

However, most party members who claimed conscientious objection status did so in the context of their moral and religious beliefs, rather than on political policy. Of these almost all were exempt from military service. About 24 party members made politics their sole grounds for exemption, of whom 12 received prison sentences. For Lewis, those who objected proved that the assimilation of Wales was "being withstood, even under the most extreme pressures".

== University of Wales by-election, 1943 ==
Prior to 1950, universities could elect and return representatives to the House of Commons. The University of Wales seat had become vacant when the constituency's Liberal Member of Parliament, Ernest Evans, had been appointed a county court judge in 1942. Lewis was selected to contest the seat for Plaid Cymru in the ensuing 1943 University of Wales by-election.

His opponent was former Plaid Genedlaethol Cymru Deputy Vice-president William John Gruffydd. Gruffydd had been voicing doubts about Lewis's ideas since 1933, and by 1943 he had left Plaid Cymru and joined the Liberal Party. His other opponent, independent candidate Alun Talfan Davies, was another former member of Plaid Genedlaethol Cymru who would later become Chairman of the Welsh Liberal Party.

The "brilliant but wayward" Gruffydd was a favorite with Welsh-speaking intellectuals and drew 52.3% of the vote, to Lewis's 22.5%.

The election effectively split the Welsh-speaking intelligentsia, and left Lewis embittered with politics, leading him to retreat from direct political involvement. However the experience proved invaluable for Plaid Cymru, as "for the first time they were taken seriously as a political force." The by-election campaign led directly to "considerable growth" in the party's membership.

== Tynged yr Iaith and the 1961 census ==
In 1962 Lewis gave a radio speech entitled Tynged yr iaith ("The Fate of the Language") in which he predicted the complete extinction of the Welsh language by 2000 unless immediate action was taken.

Lewis's radio speech was in response to the 1961 census, which showed a decrease in the percentage of Welsh speakers from 36% in 1931 to 26%, of the population of about 2.5 million. In the census the counties of Merionethshire (Meirionnydd), Anglesey (Ynys Môn), Carmarthenshire (Sir Gaerfyrddin), and Caernarfonshire averaged a 75% proportion of Welsh speakers, with the most significant decreases in the counties of Glamorgan, Flint, and Pembroke.

Assuming, "a gloomy sepulchral tone", Lewis argued that the Welsh language was, "driven into a corner, ready to be thrown, like a worthless rag, on the dung heap." The responsibility for this lay, according to Lewis, less in the hands of the British civil service bureaucracy than with the timidity and indifference of the Welsh-speaking people themselves. As he had fully intended it to do, Lewis' lecture immediately touched a raw nerve.

While Lewis' had wished to shame Plaid Cymru into more direct action promoting a Welsh language revival, his speech instead led to the formation of Cymdeithas yr Iaith Gymraeg (Welsh Language Society) later that year at a Plaid Cymru summer school held in Pontardawe in Glamorgan. The foundation of Cymdeithas yr Iaith Gymraeg allowed Plaid Cymru to focus on electoral politics, while the Cymdeithas launched a campaign of civil disobedience aimed at the State's policy of coercive Anglicisation.

According to Marcus Tanner, "For the first time, the British government was forced to recognise the existence of a substantial non-Anglophone culture, and to rethink attitudes that had been set in stone since Henry VIII's so-called Acts of Union. The new, more conciliatory attitude began under Labour, but continued under the Conservatives."

Responding to escalating demands for devolution in the United Kingdom, in 1964 the Labour Government established the Welsh Office (Welsh: Swyddfa Gymreig) and the post of Secretary of State for Wales. The Welsh Language Bill of 1967 granted Welsh equal status to English in the legal system. Further legislation belatedly granted century-old demands for Welsh-medium education.

== Later life and death ==
In 1970, Lewis was nominated for the Nobel Prize in Literature.

In March 1983, at the age of 89, Saunders Lewis was made an honorary Doctor of Letters of the University of Wales at a ceremony specially conducted at his home in Penarth. The Catholic Herald, reporting the honour, noted that in the previous year Lewis had made a plea for the restoration to the Catholic Church in Wales of the Tridentine Mass in Ecclesiastical Latin, rather than the Mass of Paul VI in the "foreign language of English", which he pointed out was "a later arrival".

Lewis died at St Winifred's Hospital in Cardiff, on 1 September 1985. Lewis' final request for a Tridentine Requiem Mass in Ecclesiastical Latin was denied by Bishop Daniel Mullins, who personally offered the Mass of Paul VI instead. Following the Funeral Mass, Lewis was buried in the same grave as his wife Margaret in St. Joseph's Roman Catholic cemetery in Penarth. Lewis's medal as a Knight Commander of the Order of St Gregory, to which he had been appointed by Pope Paul VI, was laid on Lewis' casket during the funeral ceremony and then buried with him.

== Literary legacy ==
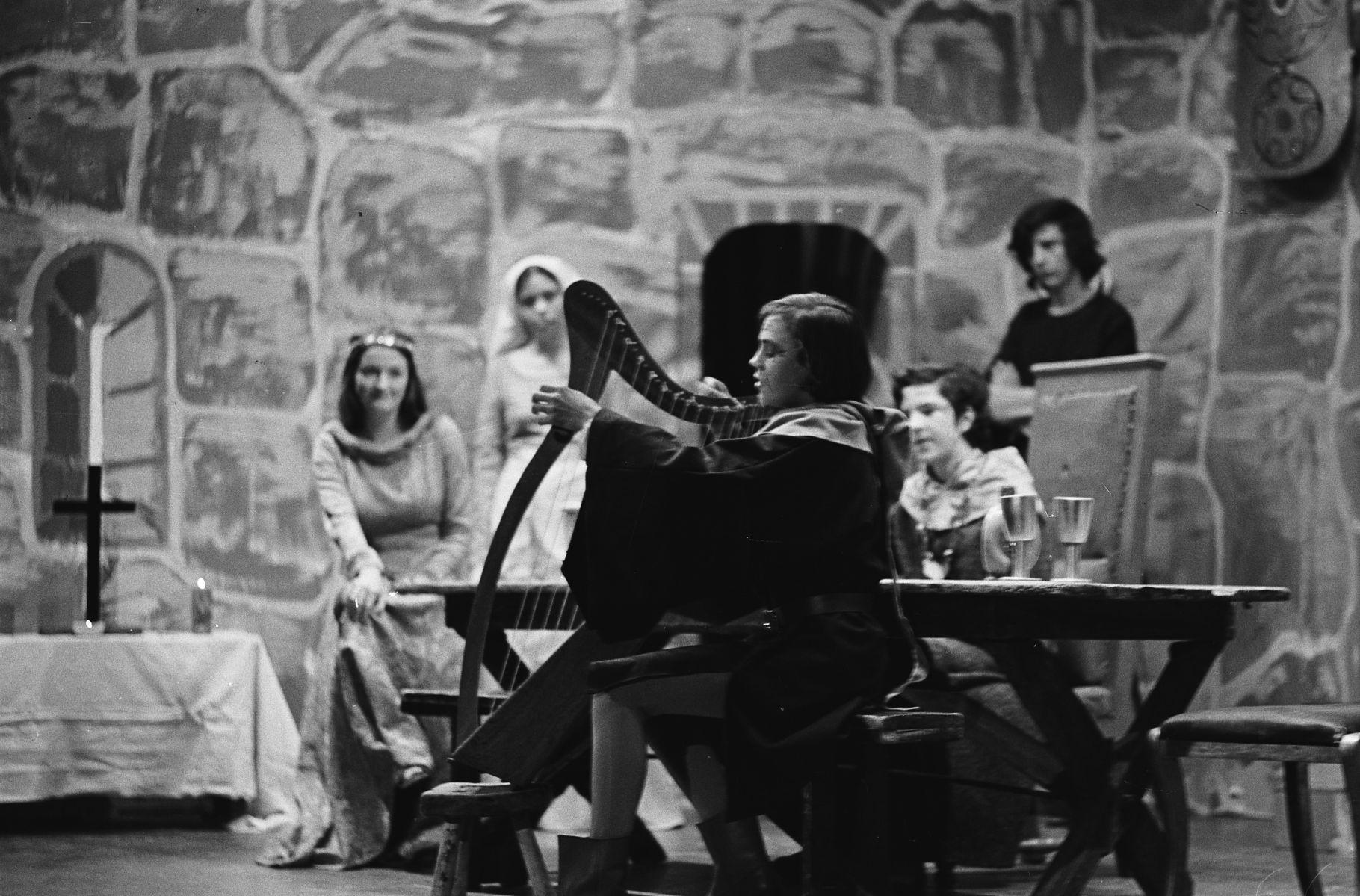
Pupils of Ysgol y Gader in Dolgellau perform Saunders Lewis' Amlyn ac Amig drama, 18 December 1973

His literary works include stage plays, poetry, novels and essays. He wrote mostly in Welsh, but he also wrote some works in English. By the time of his death in 1985 some rated him as amongst the most celebrated of Welsh writers.

Lewis was above all a dramatist. His notable plays include Blodeuwedd (The woman of flowers) (1923–25, revised 1948), Buchedd Garmon (The life of St. Germain) (radio play, 1936), Siwan (1956), Gymerwch chi sigarét? (Will you have a cigarette?) (1956), Brad (Treachery) (1958), Esther (1960), and Cymru fydd (Tomorrow's Wales) (1967). His plays drew upon a wide range of material and covered a range of subject matter including Welsh mythology and history, as well as the Christian Bible, although he also wrote plays set in contemporary Wales.

Lewis also translated Samuel Beckett's En attendant Godot from French into Welsh.

Lewis' use of poetic forms in the Welsh language included both the use of the traditional 24 strict metres in cynghanedd such as cywyddau and awdlau as well as the Sicilian School's sonnet form, "a variety of other rhyming stanzas", and "full breathed free verse", which were derived from poetry in other languages.

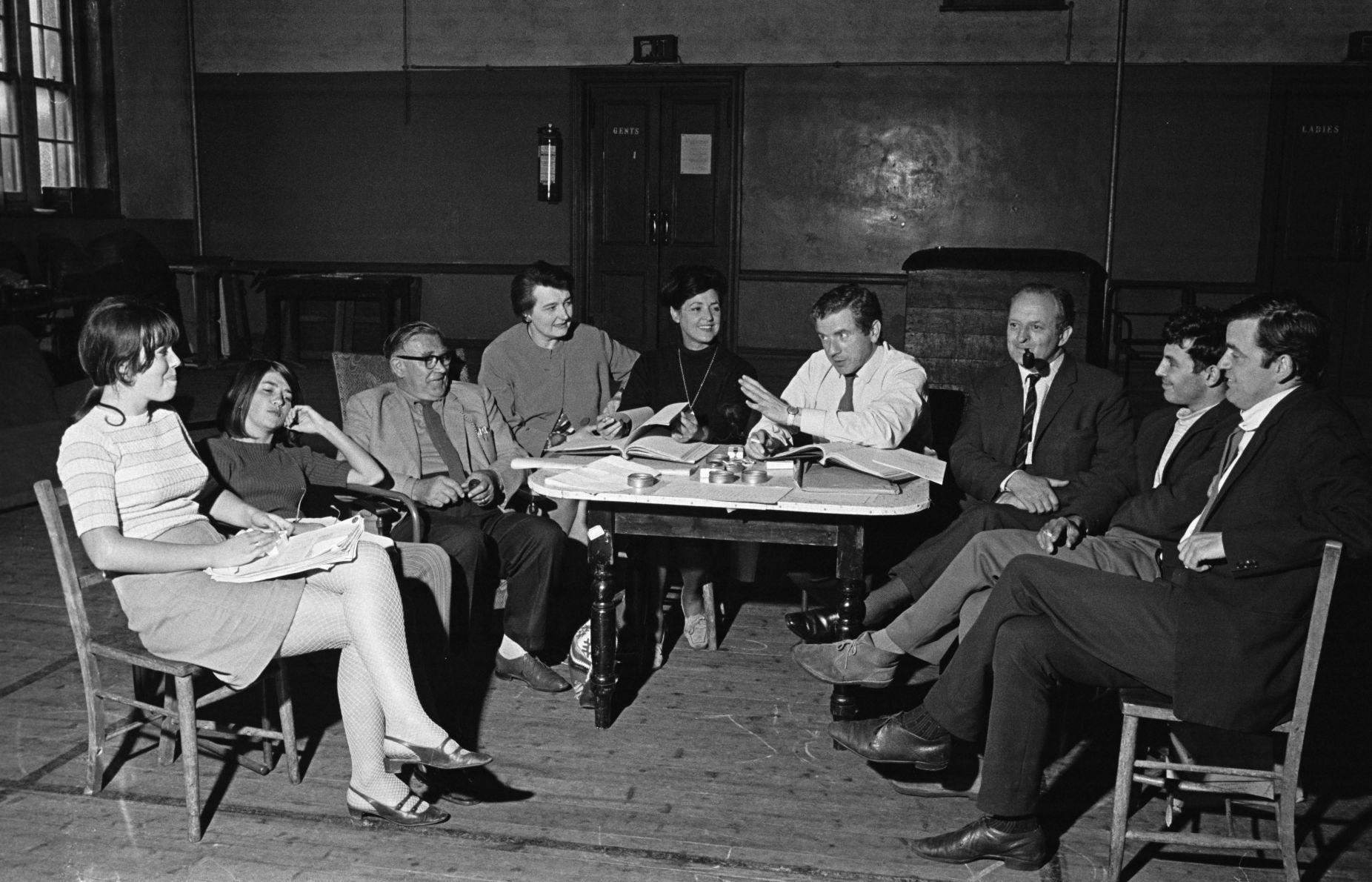
Cwmni Theatr Cymru's production of Saunders Lewis' Cymru Fydd drama at Bala Eisteddfod, 1 August 1967

Following his conversion to the Catholic Church, Lewis also wrote many works of Christian poetry inspired by his new faith. These included poems about the Real Presence in the Blessed Sacrament, a poem that sympathetically describes Saint Joseph's crisis of faith, about the traumatic but purgatorial sense of loss experienced by Saint Mary Magdalen after the Crucifixion of Jesus Christ, and about attending the Tridentine Mass on Christmas Day.

Lewis wrote the libretto for Arwel Hughes's opera Serch yw'r doctor (Love's the doctor), based on Molière's L'Amour médecin (first performance 1960 by Welsh National Opera).

He published two novels, Monica (1930) and Merch Gwern Hywel (The daughter of Gwern Hywel) (1964) and two collections of poems as well as numerous articles and essays in various newspapers, magazines and journals. These articles have been collected into volumes including: Canlyn Arthur (Following Arthur) (1938), Ysgrifau dydd Mercher (Wednesday essays) (1945), Meistri'r canrifoedd (Masters of the centuries) (1973), Meistri a'u crefft (Masters and their craft) (1981) and Ati ŵyr ifainc (Go to it, young men) (1986).

== Political and cultural legacy ==
Lewis's legacy remains a controversial one. Particularly controversial was his belief, as expressed in Braslun o Hanes Llenyddiaeth Gymraeg, a 1932 outline of the history of Welsh-language literature, that the Edwardian conquest of Wales was less damaging to Welsh culture and literature in the long run than the Protestant Reformation, which began under King Henry VIII with the destruction of the independence of the Catholic Church in Wales from control by the State. This was because, according to Lewis, King Henry's legacy ensured that subsequent Welsh literature was cut off by religious persecution and government censorship of the bardic profession from their own religious past and from their previously close links to the rest of Europe.

This was why Lewis urged Welsh-language writers as early as 1919 to read, translate, and draw influence from literature in many other European languages, rather than, as he and many others before him had once done, only reading and emulating literature in English. This is also why he particularly recommended translating into the Welsh-language and arranging regular performances in the theatres of the best French poets and playwrights of the Counter-Reformation and the Baroque era. Despite his own Francophilia, Lewis had also mentioned the importance of combatting the Black Legend by exposing the Welsh people to the literary canon of Spanish Golden Age theatre, whose greatest playwrights included Miguel de Cervantes, Lope de Vega, and Pedro Calderón de la Barca.

Without mentioning Pope Gregory XI or his 1373 "règle d'idiom", command for the Catholic clergy to both learn and communicate with their flocks in the local vernacular, Lewis believed that the coercive Anglicisation of the Welsh people began with the Acts of Union passed under King Henry VIII following his break with the Holy See and commented, "it was this materialistic and pagan triumph that destroyed our Wales."

Explaining his preference for the era before King Henry VIII, Lewis wrote, "There was one law and one civilisation throughout Europe, but that law, that civilisation took on many forms and many colours. It did not occur to the rulers of a country to destroy another land's civilisation, even when they conquered that land... Despite being conquered, being oppressed, too, and quite cruelly, it (Welsh civilisation) grew upright and without losing the innate qualities of its culture. No doubt Wales often yearned for freedom, but did not fear losing its heritage, nor did it. Because there was one law and one authority throughout Europe, Welsh civilisation was safe, and the Welsh language and the special Welsh way of life and society."

For example, historian John Davies writes that, "in a notable article", Saunders Lewis argued that the Welsh bards of the Medieval era, "were expressing in their poetry a love for a stable, deep-rooted civilization." Lewis added that the bards "were the leading upholders of the belief that a hierarchical social structure, 'the heritage and tradition of an ancient aristocracy', were the necessary precondition of civilized life and that there were deep philosophical roots to this belief."

Despite his many statements to the contrary, Lewis' allegedly "condescending attitude towards some aspects of the Nonconformist, radical and pacifist traditions of Wales", also drew extremely harsh criticism from fellow Welsh nationalists such as D. J. Davies, a socialist Plaid Cymru member.

Lewis, however, always insisted that his conversion to Catholicism did not keep him from understanding the sensibilities or appreciating the role played in Welsh culture by the Nonconformists. For example, he praised Methodism and Calvinism for preserving the uniqueness of Welsh-language literature and culture against the Anglophilia and linguistic imperialism favoured by the Victorian era Welsh gentry, the Government in Westminster, and the Established Church.

Along with his careful study of what had worked and what had failed in Irish nationalism, these were the real roots of Lewis' beliefs that Welsh cultural and language revival, Christian democracy, rural landscape conservation, and an Irish-style Land War - meaning direct action tactics intended to reduce rents and coerce an Irish-style breakup and sale of the gentry's estates to their tenants - were preferable causes for the Welsh nationalist movement to embrace than socialism and which have attracted such extreme criticism, both during Lewis' lifetime and since his death.

In particular, D.J. Davies denounced Lewis' calls for Welsh language revival and cultural nationalism. Davies called instead for engaging the English-speaking South Wales valleys. Davies also pointed towards left-wing political parties in Scandinavia as a model for Plaid Cymru to emulate, and was accordingly far more interested in the "economic implications" of Welsh self-determination.

Left wing historian Geraint H. Jenkins has written, "Lewis was a cold fish. His reedy voice, bow tie, cerebral style and aristocratic contempt for the proletariat were hardly endearing qualities in a political leader, and his conversion to Catholicism lost him the sympathy of fervent Nonconformists. Heavily influenced by the discourse of right-wing French theorists, this profoundly authoritarian figure developed a grand strategy, such as it was, based on the deindustrialization of Wales. Such a scheme was both impractical and unpopular. It caused grave embarrassment to his socialist colleague D. J. Davies, a progressive economist who, writing with force and passion, showed a much better grasp of the economic realities of the time and greater sensitivity towards the plight of working people.

During the post-World War II battles between Plaid Cymru and the Labour Party over political control of South Wales, a hostile 1946 portrait mocked Saunders Lewis for thinking himself to be the "Masaryk of Wales" and that both the United Kingdom and the very concept of Britishness would one day to collapse similarly to the Austro-Hungarian Empire in 1918. The same writer then sarcastically feigned sympathy for Plaid Cymru, a political party which was allegedly burdened by, "bitterness and hate and the (possibly unintentional) air of physical superiority with which only too many of its members have regarded the bulk of their countrymen."

During the 1990s, in the midst of a debate over the Government of Wales Act 1998, Saunders Lewis was also accused in the House of Commons of having praised Adolf Hitler in 1936 with the words, "At once he fulfilled his promise — a promise which was greatly mocked by the London papers months before that — to completely abolish the financial strength of the Jews in the economic life of Germany."

In 2001, former Plaid Cymru President Dafydd Elis-Thomas accused Saunders Lewis during a television documentary of being, "lousy as a politician, lousy as a writer, but a good Catholic".

In the same book, Tanner credited the famous 1962 radio lecture by Saunders Lewis with being the primary reason why the Welsh language was, as of 2004, the only one of the Celtic languages that was neither dead or critically endangered.

According to Tanner, "Welsh is more visible than ever before. The moment I drove across the Severn Bridge, signs written in a different language proclaimed that I had entered a different land. It was not like Scotland, where Gaelic bilingual signs were limited to a few Highland areas. As for the Bretons in France, they can only dream of such symbols of recognition. You can live your life in Welsh now, at least in theory. The officials of the North Western Railway, who fired workers on the line from Holyhead to Chester for their inability or unwillingness to speak English in the 1890s, would have a tough time of it now. It is the English-speaking monoglot who faces a problem in trying to work in the public sector, and the language sections of universities do a booming trade in teaching basic Welsh to English professionals who have taken up such posts. Saunders Lewis saved more than most people though possible by his stirring radio address back in 1962."

Lewis' legacy is further reflected by the fact that, even in decaying and traditionally English-speaking Welsh colliery and industrial towns and cities, Welsh-medium education is increasingly used as a means of both heritage language learning and reasserting national identity.

Saunders Lewis was voted by the as the 10th greatest Welsh national hero in a 2004 poll of the '100 Welsh Heroes' poll.

=== Accusations of Fascism and Anti-semitism ===
Saunders Lewis has occasionally been explicitly or implicitly accused of fascist tendencies or sympathies as well as of being anti-semitic. He was also an explicit critic of fascism, and in a comprehensive study of the accusations of fascism levelled at Plaid Cymru and its members by academic Richard Wyn Jones concluded that whilst he had expressed admiration before the war for some right-wing figures like Maurras (as had many British politicians), Lewis's politics met none of the criteria for fascism or even authoritarianism, that Lewis was best described as a conservative, and that there was no basis for describing Lewis or the party he had founded as fascist. These accusations should, argues Jones, be understood as arising from criticisms of Plaid Cymru's pacifist stance during the war, as well as being an attempt to undermine Welsh nationalism as a political movement.

There are occasional individual examples of antisemitic language and stereotyping to be found in the writings of Lewis in the period 1920-40, such as in his attacks on Alfred Mond and Karl Marx, and very occasionally in his literary work such as a reference to Wall Street bankers with "ffroenau Hebraeg ('Hebrew noses')" in an apocalyptic poem, 'Y Dilyw'; and in his novel Monica. These kinds of references are absent from his post-war writing, and both before and after the war Lewis had also explicitly condemned anti-semitism and the persecution of Jews. Richard Wyn Jones concludes that whilst there are undoubtedly individual examples of anti-semitism in Lewis's work, these are rare in the context of his complete ourve and are comparable to those made at the time by figures from other political traditions such as Winston Churchill and George Orwell; and that there was no racial element to any policy position advocated or adopted by Lewis or the party he founded.

== Electoral record ==
Lewis contested the University of Wales Constituency on two occasions, once in the general election of 1931;

General election 1931: University of Wales
| Party | Candidate | Votes | % | ±% |
|---|---|---|---|---|
| Liberal | Ernest Evans | 2,229 | 75.4 | +11.9 |
| Plaid Cymru | Saunders Lewis | 914 | 24.6 | N/A |
| Majority | | 1,315 | 50.8 | +12.2 |
| Turnout | | 3,143 | | |
| Liberal hold | | Swing | N/A | |

and again in the University of Wales by-election of 1943.

25–29 January 1943 by-election: University of Wales
| Party | Candidate | Votes | % | ±% |
|---|---|---|---|---|
| Liberal | William John Gruffydd | 3,098 | 52.3 | −9.0 |
| Plaid Cymru | Saunders Lewis | 1,330 | 22.5 | N/A |
| Independent | Alun Talfan Davies | 755 | 12.8 | N/A |
| Independent Labour | Evan Davies | 634 | 10.7 | N/A |
| Independent Labour | N.L. Evans | 101 | 1.7 | N/A |
| Majority | | 1,768 | 29.8 | +7.2 |
| Turnout | | 5,918 | 53.4 | −9.0 |
| Registered electors | | 11,079 | | |
| Liberal hold | | Swing | N/A | |

Party political offices
| Preceded by New position | Vice President of Plaid Cymru; 1925–1926 | Succeeded by ? |
| Preceded by Lewis Valentine | President of Plaid Cymru; 1926–1939 | Succeeded by John Edward Daniel |
