= W. J. Gruffydd =

Welsh scholar and politician (1881–1954)

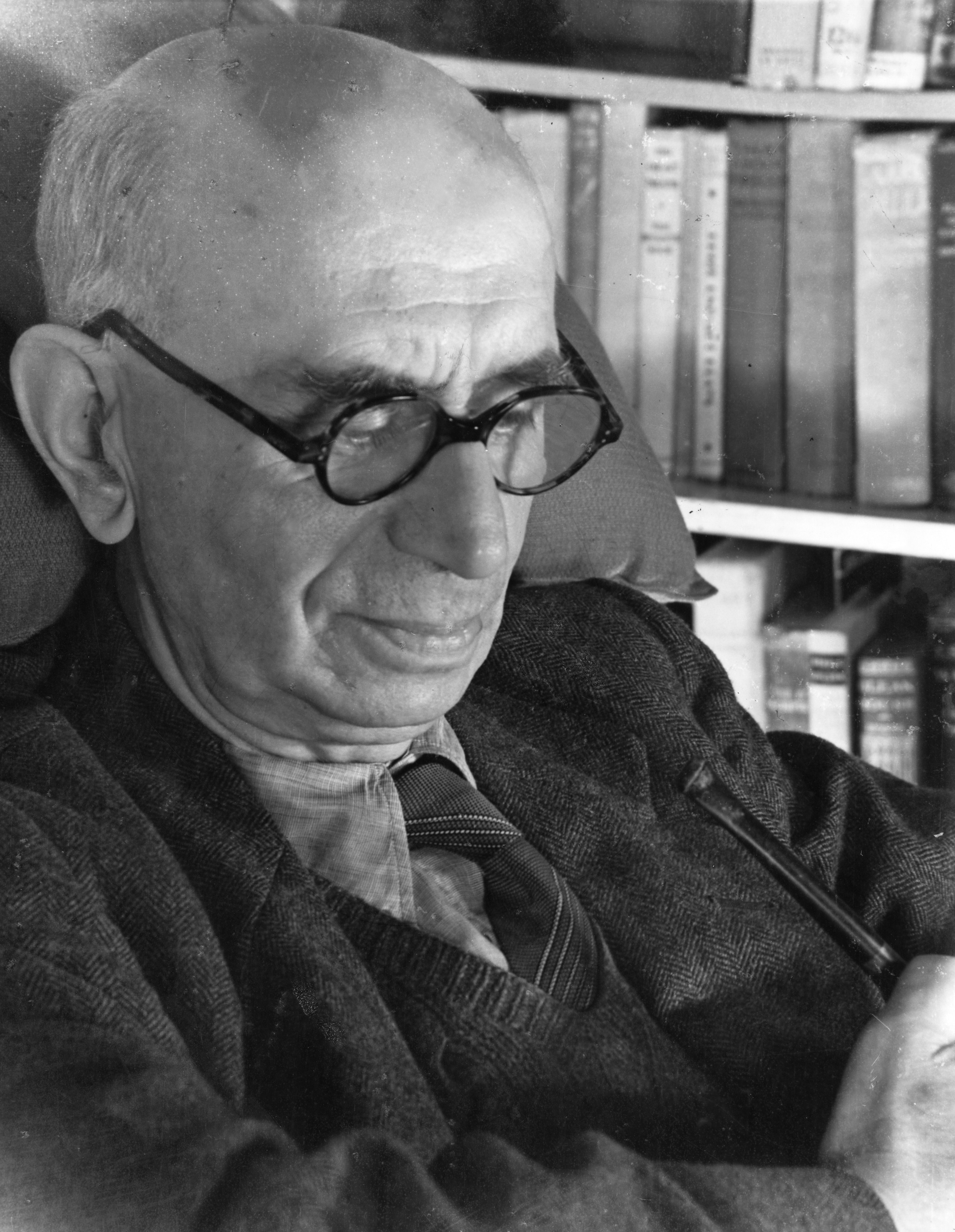
- Born: 14 February 1881; Bethel, Caernarfonshire, Wales
- Died: 29 September 1954 (aged 73); Caernarfon, Caernarfonshire, Wales

William John Gruffydd (14 February 1881 – 29 September 1954) was a Welsh scholar, poet, writer and editor, and the last Member of Parliament to represent the University of Wales seat.

== Family, education and early life ==
Gruffydd was born in Gorffwysfa, Bethel, in the parish of Llanddeiniolen, Caernarfonshire, the son of a quarryman.

In 1894, after elementary schooling at Bethel primary school, he was one of the first students to join the recently opened Caernarvon County School. In 1899, he won a place at Jesus College, Oxford, graduating in English literature.

In 1904 he was appointed Assistant Master at Beaumaris Grammar School, and in 1906 Lecturer in Celtic at University College, Cardiff (now Cardiff University).

In 1909 he married Gwenda Evans, the daughter of a minister of religion from Abercarn. They had one son.

During the First World War he volunteered for service with the Royal Navy: he served from 1915 to 1918 as a naval officer in the North Sea and the Mediterranean.

On being demobilised, he was appointed Professor of Celtic at University College, Cardiff (succeeding Professor Thomas Powel, who retired in 1918), and he held the chair until his retirement in 1946.

== Poet and academic ==
Gruffydd published his first volume of poetry, Telynegion ("Lyrics") jointly with his friend and fellow-poet R. Silyn Roberts in 1900, having written its contents in the summer of 1899 before he left for Oxford. Although Gruffydd would later regard his own contributions to the volume as juvenilia, the volume would later be compared to Wordsworth and Coleridge's Lyrical Ballads in heralding a new era in Welsh poetry. Alongside poets such as R. Silyn Roberts, T. Gwynn Jones, R. Williams Parry he is associated with a "renaissance" in Welsh poetry at the turn of the century associated with a late resurgence of romanticism. Although his total poetical output is comparatively small, due in part to the pressures of his academic work, it was of a very high standard and he was a major voice in Welsh-language poetry of the first two decades of the 20th century. He won the Crown at the National Eisteddfod in 1909 for his Pryddest on Yr Arglwydd Rhys (Rhys ap Gruffudd; no relation).

After graduating in English at Oxford he became a schoolteacher and worked in Scarborough and then for two years at Beaumaris Grammar School before taking a post as assistant lecturer in Celtic studies at University College, Cardiff, in 1906; from 1918 he was appointed Professor of Celtic and held the post in 1946. He was instrumental in the transformation of the study of Welsh literature at universities in Wales. When he began teaching at university level, students of "Celtic" (as it was referred to then) would study no literature more recent then 1800 and almost nothing after 1500; the language of instruction was English even though all present would be fluent Welsh speakers and the subject matter in Welsh, and the students' main contribution was in translating passages into English. Although Gruffydd was one of many academics to react against this state of affairs, he was key in leading the transformation and the department at Cardiff was the first to teach the literature of the 19th century, the first to lecture in Welsh, the first to be referred to as a department of "Welsh" rather than "Celtic" (Ironically Gruffydd also introduced Irish and Breton literature to the syllabus, making the course more genuinely "Celtic" than it had ever been when referred to as such). Within a few years the other Welsh universities had all followed most of these innovations.

He was President of Council of the National Eisteddfod of Wales and edited Y Llenor ('The Writer', a highly influential Welsh-language journal of literature published by the university). As a researcher and academic he wrote a large number of books and articles and remains one of the key figures of his age in Welsh literary studies.

== Politics ==
Coming from a nonconformist, radical family, Gruffydd took an interest in Welsh politics and social questions. He was a member of Plaid Cymru and served as deputy vice-president in 1937. However, Gruffydd voiced disagreement with the party president Saunders Lewis, which eventually led to his leaving the party.

Gruffydd was elected to Parliament as a Liberal Member of Parliament (MP) for the University of Wales seat in a by-election on 29 January 1943 after the sitting MP Ernest Evans became a County Court Judge. Gruffydd's exact political status at the election was ambiguous: despite having the official endorsement of the Liberal Party he was not (and never had been) a member and was listed as an independent on the ballot. Gruffydd's opponent in the by-election was Plaid Cymru's Saunders Lewis, and he had effectively split the Welsh-speaking community. His biographer T. Robin Chapman suggests that standing against Lewis, with whom he had held a longstanding political and intellectual feud played out over the pages of Y Llenor and elsewhere, was Gruffydd's main motivation in standing in the election. He was comfortably re-elected in the 1945 general election and sat until the abolition of university seats in 1950. He did not stand again for Parliament.

== Historians' judgment of his political career ==
The 1945 general election brought a reduction in Liberal strength in the House of Commons and was particularly savage for its leadership. Sir Archibald Sinclair, the party leader, lost his seat in Caithness and Sutherland, the Chief Whip Sir Percy Harris and William Beveridge were also beaten. In fact, with the exception of Gwilym Lloyd-George (who was in any case travelling in the direction of the Conservatives) every Liberal MP who had ever held government office was defeated. This meant that a new leader was required. Gruffydd was not a candidate and historians have noted that he was more concerned with his academic work than with trying to make a career in politics, but the judgment of one historian of the Liberal Party that he was an academic of extremely limited political experience only sitting in the House because of the university seats seems unduly harsh in the light of Gruffydd's long-time association with Welsh political and social affairs his previous vice-presidency of Plaid Cymru and his managing to be returned to the House of Commons when so many others were falling by the wayside; even candidates for university seats had to win the votes of real voters.

== Death ==
Gruffydd died at his home in Bangor Road, Caernarfon, on 29 September 1954. He was buried in the cemetery at Llanddeiniolen near the yew tree about which he composed one of his most famous poems.

== Sources ==
=== Books and journals ===
English language:

- Jones, J. Graham (June 1993). "The Liberal Party and Wales, 1945–79" (PDF). Welsh History Review. 16 (3): 326–55.
- C. W. Lewis and Clare L. Taylor, 'William John Gruffydd' in the Dictionary of National Biography, OUP 2004–2008
- Who was Who, OUP 2007

Welsh language:

- Chapman, T. Robin (June 1993). W. J. Gruffydd (in Welsh). Gwasg Prifysgol Cymru / University of Wales Press. ISBN 9780708312001.
- Lewis, Ceri W (1994). "W. J. Gruffydd". Y Traethodydd. CXLIX: 200–222 – via Llyfrgell Genedlaethol Cymru / The National Library of Wales.

== Papers ==
Papers of W. J. Gruffydd, [1903]–[1952], including drafts of articles relating to the Mabinogi; lecture notes for his Welsh courses at University College of Wales, Cardiff; other lecture notes and articles; BBC broadcast talks; personalia; and a substantial group of correspondence from notable literary figures are deposited in the National Library of Wales, Aberystwyth.

Parliament of the United Kingdom
Preceded by Ernest Evans	Member of Parliament for University of Wales; 1943 – 1950	Constituency abolished
