= Angharad James (poet) =

Welsh writer (1677–1749)

Angharad James (16 July 1677 – 25 August 1749) was a Welsh farmer, harpist and poet.

== Life ==
She was born in Gelliffrydau farm at Baladeulyn in the Nantlle Valley, Wales, on 16 July 1677. When still a young woman, she married William Prichard, a man far older than herself, who farmed Cwm Penamnen, a valley to the south of Dolwyddelan. She lived in Parlwr, or Tai Penamnen, a house which had earlier been a home to the Wynn family of Gwydir, for the remainder of her life. She continued to farm the valley after being widowed. As of 2009, the house was being uncovered by archaeologists.

== Death ==
She was buried on 25 August 1749 and is buried within the church of St. Gwyddelan in Dolwyddelan.

== Arts ==
She was a skilled harpist who commanded her workers to dance to her playing as they returned from the milking.

She is notable as an early Welsh female poet. Due in part to the transcription work of one of James's correspondents, the poet and copyist Margaret Davies, manuscripts of James's work have survived and are held at the National Library of Wales. They include an elegy to her son, who had died when 16, and another to her husband, in the form of an imaginary dialogue.
