= Stanley (name) =

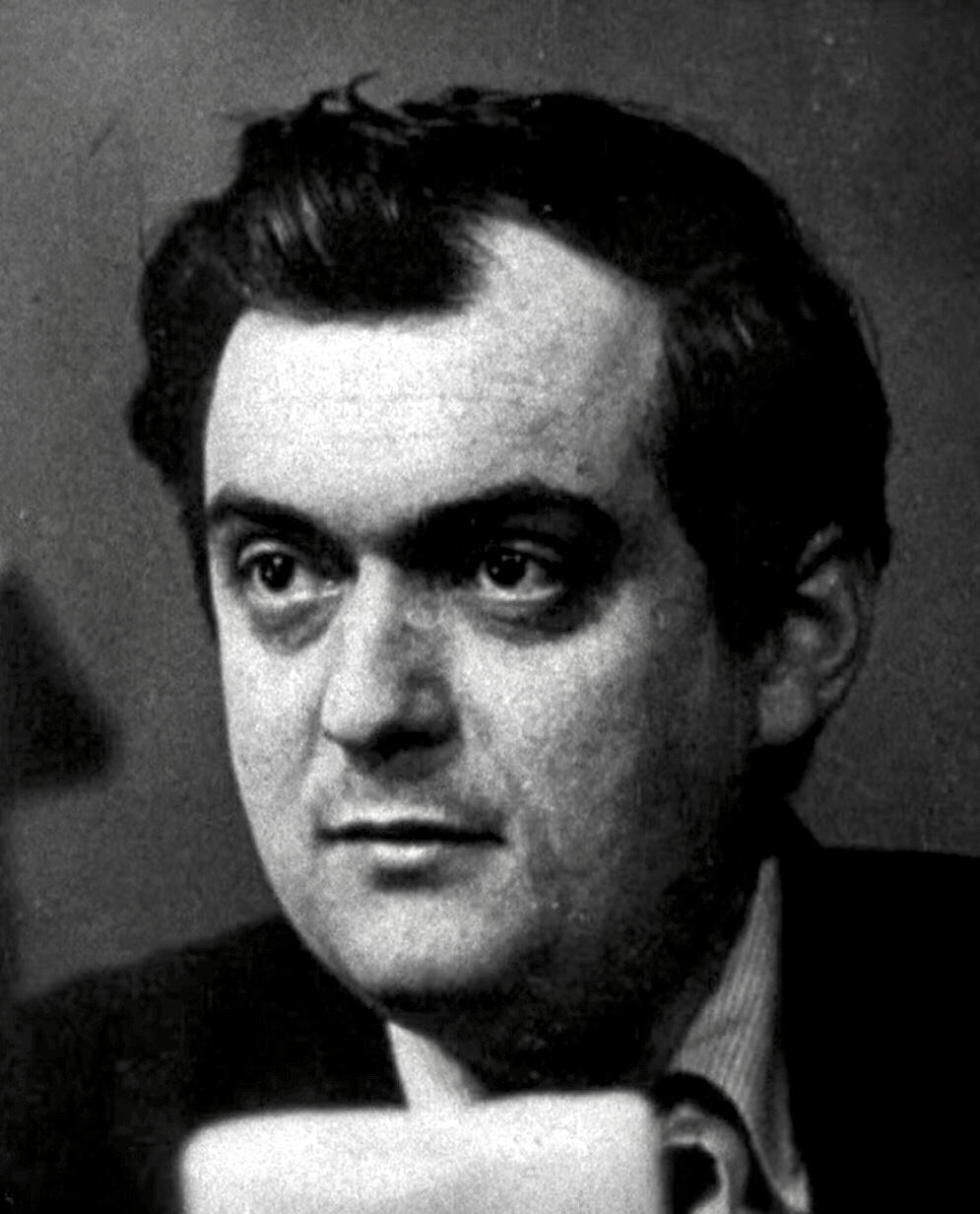
- Stanley Kubrick in 1963
- Pronunciation: /ˈstænli/
- Gender: Male
- Language: Old English

Origin
- Meaning: "stone leigh"
- Region of origin: England

Other names
- Alternative spelling: Stanly, Stanlee
- Nickname: Stan
- See also: Lea, Lee, Leigh

Stanley is a toponymic surname, a contraction of stan (a form of "stone") and leigh (meadow), later also being used as a masculine given name.

== People with the given name ==
- Stanley Adams (actor) (1915–1977), American actor and screenwriter
- Stanley Adams (singer) (1907–1994), American singer and lyricist
- Stanley Adams (whistleblower) (born c. 1927), Swiss pharmaceutical company executive and corporate whistleblower
- Stanley T. Adams (1922–1999), American Army officer, recipient of the Medal of Honor during the Korean War
- Stanley Theodore Adams (born 1966), American serial killer
- Stanley Amis (1924–2021), British architect
- Stanley Andrisse (born 1983), American endocrinologist
- Stan Arthur (born 1935), U.S. Navy officer; Vice Chief of Naval Operations (1992–95)
- Stanley Baker (1928–1976), Welsh actor and producer
- Stanley Baldwin (1867–1947), British statesman; three-time prime minister of the United Kingdom (1923–24, 1924–29, 1935–37)
- Stanley Baxter (1926–2025), Scottish actor, comedian, impressionist, and author
- Stanley Berryhill (born 1998), American football player
- Stanley Bleifeld (1924–2011), American sculptor
- Stanley Booth-Clibborn (1924–1996), British Anglican bishop
- Stanley Branche (1933–1992), American civil rights leader
- Stanley Brundy (born 1967), American basketball player
- Stanley Burnside (born 1947), Bahamian cartoonist and painter
- Stanley Burrell (born 1962), American rapper better known by his stage name MC Hammer
- Stanley Cavell (1926–2018), American philosopher
- Stanley Chais (1926–2010), American investment advisor in the Madoff investment scandal
- Stanley Chera (1942–2020), American real estate developer
- Stanley R. Christianson (1925–1950), American Marine, awarded Medal of Honor
- Stanley Clarke (born 1951), American jazz and funk bassist
- Stanley Clements (1926–1981), American actor and comedian
- Stanley Cohen (attorney) (born 1953), attorney and human rights advocate
- Stanley Cohen (biochemist) (1922–2020), American Nobel Prize Laureate in Physiology and Medicine
- Stanley Cohen (physicist) (1927–2017), founder and president of Speakeasy Computing Corporation
- Stanley Cohen (sociologist) (1942–2013), Martin White Professor of Sociology at the London School of Economics
- Stanley G. Cohen (1928–2022), American music educator
- Stanley Norman Cohen (born 1935), American geneticist
- Stanley Donen (1924–2019), American film director and choreographer
- Stan Drake (1921–1997), American cartoonist
- Stanley Ann Dunham (1942–1995), American anthropologist and mother of Barack Obama, the 44th president of the United States
- Stanley Ellis (linguist) (1926–2009), English linguistics scholar and broadcaster
- Stanley Ellis (cricketer) (1896–1987), English cricketer
- Stanley Venn Ellis (1875–1916), Royal Navy officer
- Stan Ellis (born 1952), American businessman and politician in California
- Stanley Fields (actor) (1883–1941), American actor
- Stanley Fields (biologist) (born 1955), American biologist
- Stanley Fischer (born 1943), Israeli-American economist
- Stanley Fisher (1867–1949), British colonial judge; 24th Chief Justice of Ceylon (1926–30)
- Stanley H. Ford (1877–1961), United States Army General
- Stanley Fung (1945–2025), Hong Kong actor and film director
- Stanley Jerome Gaetz (1914–1964), member of the North Dakota Senate
- Stanley Goble (1891–1948), Royal Australian Air Force commander
- Stanley G. Grizzle (1918–2016), Canadian citizenship judge and labour union activist
- Stanley Heaps (1880–1962), English architect responsible for the design of a number of stations on the London Underground system
- Stanley Ho (1921–2020), Hong Kong-Macau businessman
- Stanley Holloway (1890–1982), English actor, comedian, singer and monologist
- Stanley Johnson (basketball) (born 1996), American basketball player
- Stanley Johnson (politician) (1869–1937), UK solicitor, MP 1918–1924
- Stanley Johnson (writer) (born 1940), British-French politician and writer
- Stanley A. Johnson (1925–2013), US politician, farmer, and minister
- Stanley E. Johnson, American film editor
- Stanley Jones (cyclist) (1888–1962), British Olympic cyclist
- Stanley Kalpage (died 2000), Permanent Representative of Sri Lanka to the United Nations from 1991 to 1994
- Stanley Kamel (1943–2008), American actor
- Stanley Klein, several people:
  - Stanley A. Klein, American neuroscientist
  - Stanley H. Klein (1908–1992), American architect
- Stanley Kramer (1913–2001), American film director and producer
- Stanley Krippner (born 1932), American psychologist, parapsychologist, and Professor of Psychology at Saybrook University
- Stanley Kubrick (1928–1999), American film director, producer, and screenwriter
- Stanley Kurtz, American conservative commentator
- Stan Laurel (born Arthur Stanley Jefferson, 1890–1965), English comic actor, writer and film director
- Stanley Lechtzin (born 1936), American artist, jeweler, metalsmith, and educator
- Stan Lee (1922–2018), American comic book writer, editor, and publisher
- Stanley Lewis, several people:
  - Stanley Lewis (sculptor) (1930–2006), Canadian sculptor
  - Stanley Cornwell Lewis (1905–2009), British portrait painter and illustrator
- Stanley Love, several people:
  - Stan Love (basketball) (1949–2025), American basketball player
  - Stanley G. Love (born 1965), American scientist and astronaut
- Sir Stanley Matthews (1915–2000), British footballer
- Stanley Mazor (born 1941), American electrical engineer and inventor
- Stanley A. McChrystal (born 1954), former Commander, International Security Assistance Force and U.S. Forces Afghanistan
- Stanley Meltzoff (1917–2006), American illustrator
- Stanley Middleton (1919–2009), British novelist
- Stanley Morgan Jr. (born 1996), American football player
- Stanley Myers (1930–1993), English composer and conductor
- Stanley Nelson Jr. (born 1951), American documentary filmmaker
- Stanley Nibbs (1914–1985) British Virgin Islander teacher
- Stanley Ocitti (born 1980), Ugandan basketball player
- Stan Owen (1932–2019), Welsh rugby union and rugby league footballer
- Stanley G. Payne (born 1934), American historian and Hispanist
- Stanley Peiris (1941–2002), Sri Lankan Sinhala musician and composer
- Stanley Plotkin (born 1932), American physician, vaccinologist, and immunologist
- Stanley B. Prusiner (born 1942), American neurologist and biochemist
- Stanley Richieri Afonso (born 1985), Brazilian footballer
- Stanley Robinson (disambiguation), several people
- Stanley Rogers Resor (1917–2012), American lawyer and military officer; 9th United States Secretary of the Army
- Stanley Jedidiah Samartha (1920–2001), Indian theologian
- Stanley Savige (1890–1954), Australian soldier and businessman
- Stanley Schmidt (born 1944), American science fiction author and editor
- Stanley Schumacher (1933–2020), Canadian politician
- Stanley Senanayake (1918–1989) Sri Lankan law enforcement official
- Stanley Shakespeare (1963–2005), American football player
- Stanley Shanfield, American inventor
- Stanley Sheff, American film director and writer
- Stanley Gerald Umphrey Shier (1903–1968), Canadian doctor; 18th Canadian Surgeon General
- Stanley de Silva (1956–1980), Sri Lankan cricketer
- Stanley Tillekeratne (1928–2005), former Speaker of the Parliament of Sri Lanka
- Stanley Tretick (1921–1999), American photojournalist
- Stanley Tucci (born 1960), American actor, writer, producer and film director
- Stanley Turrentine (1934–2000), American jazz saxophonist
- Stanley Unwin, several people:
  - Stanley Unwin (comedian) (1911–2002), South African-born comedic writer and performer
  - Stanley Unwin (publisher) (1884–1968), British publisher, founder of George Allen and Unwin
- Stanley Wagner (disambiguation), several people
- Stanley J. Wawrzyniak (1927–1995), American Marine officer, recipient of two Navy Crosses during Korean War
- Stanley G. Weinbaum (1902–1935), American science fiction writer
- Stanley Whittaker (born 1994), American basketball player
- Stanley Wojcicki (1937–2023), Polish American emeritus professor and former chair of the physics department at Stanford University
- Stanley Wolpert (1927–2019), American historian and Indologist
- Stanley Woodward Jr. (born 1983), American lawyer
- Stanley Yau (born 1990), Hong Kong singer, dancer and actor
- Stanley Zabka (1924–2023), American songwriter, filmmaker, and television director
- Stanley Zeigler, American politician
- Stanley de Zoysa (1907–1970), Sri Lankan businessman and politician

== People with the family name ==
- Aileen Stanley (1897–1982), American popular singer
- Alessandra Stanley (born 1955), American journalist
- Allan Stanley (1926–2013), Canadian ice hockey player
- Antwaun Stanley, American singer, songwriter
- Arthur Penrhyn Stanley (1815–1881), English churchman, dean of Westminster
- Barbara Stanley (1949–2023), American psychologist, researcher, and suicidologist
- Barney Stanley (1893–1971), Canadian professional ice hockey player
- Benson Stanley (born 1984), Australian-born, New Zealand Rugby Union player
- Bob Stanley (baseball) (born 1954), American baseball player
- Bob Stanley (musician) (born 1964), English musician
- Brian Stanley (disambiguation), multiple people
- Cassius Stanley (born 1999), American basketball player
- Chad Stanley (born 1976), American football player
- Charles Stanley (disambiguation), multiple people
- Chase Stanley (born 1989), Australian-New Zealand Rugby League player
- Christopher Stanley (born 1965), American actor
- Clinton Warrington Stanley (1830–1884), Justice of the New Hampshire Supreme Court
- David S. Stanley (1828–1902), Union general in the American Civil War and Medal of Honor recipient
- Dimitrious Stanley (1974–2023), American football player
- Dorothy Stanley (1924–1990), American educator
- Edward Stanley (disambiguation), multiple people
- Emily Stanley, American limnologist
- Fiona Stanley (born 1946), Australian epidemiologist
- Florence Stanley (1924–2003), American actress
- Francis Edgar Stanley (1849–1918), American businessman, co-inventor of the Stanley Steamer
- Frank C. Stanley, late 19th-early 20th-century American popular singer; stage name for William S. Grinsted
- Freelan O. Stanley (1849–1940), co-inventor of the Stanley Steamer and founder of the Stanley Hotel
- Frederick Trent Stanley (1802–1883), American industrialist, founder of Stanley Works
- George F. G. Stanley (1907–2002), Canadian historian and designer of the Canadian flag
- Ginger Stanley (1931–2023), American model, actress and stunt woman
- Helen Camille Stanley (1930–2021), American composer and violist
- Henrietta Stanley, Baroness Stanley of Alderley (1807–1895), British campaigner for women's education
- Henrietta Stanley Dull (1863–1964), American food writer
- Henry Stanley (cricketer) (1873–1900), English cricketer
- Henry Bruce 'Harry' Stanley (1953–1999), Scottish painter and decorator mistakenly shot by police
- Henry Morton Stanley (1841–1904), Welsh-American journalist and explorer, searched for Dr. Livingstone
- Ian Stanley (born 1957), British musician
- James Stanley (disambiguation), several people
- Jamie Stanley (born 1983), British racing driver
- Jayson Stanley (born 1997), American football player
- Joe Stanley (rugby union) (born 1957), New Zealand Rugby Union player
- John Stanley (disambiguation), several people
- Kim Stanley (1925–2001), American actress
- Leo Stanley (1886–1976), American surgeon
- Lisa Stanley (born 1973), Irish singer, songwriter, and presenter
- Logan Stanley (born 1998), Canadian ice hockey player
- Matthew Stanley (born 1992), New Zealand Olympic swimmer
- Mervin C. Stanley (1857–1907), New York politician
- Michael Stanley (1948–2021), American rock singer
- Michael Stanley (rugby union) (born 1989), Samoan Rugby Union player
- Mickey Stanley (born 1942), American baseball player
- Mike Stanley (born 1963), American baseball player
- Mike Stanley (rower) (born 1957), New Zealand Olympic rower and sports administrator
- Millicent Preston-Stanley (1883–1955), Australian feminist and politician
- Muriel Stanley (1918–1979), Indigenous Australian Anglican missionary, nurse and social worker
- Nate Stanley (born 1997), American football player
- Oliver Stanley (1896–1950), British politician
- Owen Stanley (1811–1850), British naval captain
- Owsley Stanley (1935–2011), American "underground" chemist, mass-produced LSD
- Paco Stanley (1942–1999), Mexican television entertainer, assassinated
- Paul Stanley (born 1952), American rock guitarist and vocalist
- Peter Stanley (born 1956), Australian historian
- Ralph Stanley (1927–2016), American bluegrass musician, one of the Stanley Brothers
- Richard Stanley (director) (born 1966), South African-born film director
- Richard Stanley (politician) (1920–1983), British Conservative Party Member of Parliament 1950–1966
- Richard P. Stanley (born 1944), American mathematician at MIT
- Robbie Stanley (born 1967), American auto racing driver
- Ronja Stanley (born 1991), Finnish singer, known as Ronya
- Ronnie Stanley (born 1994), American football player
- Sachini Ayendra Stanley, Sri Lankan Burgher cinema actress and model
- Sam Stanley (rugby union) (born 1991) English Rugby Union player
- Sara Griffith Stanley Woodward (1837–1918; born: Stanley), U.S. abolitionist, author, educator
- Sidney Stanley (died 1969), Polish-British businessman
- Sidney Stanley (cricketer) (born 1933), South African cricketer
- Steven J. C. Stanley (born 1958), Jamaican audio engineer and producer
- Steven M. Stanley (born 1941), American palaeontologist
- The Stanley Brothers, Carter and Ralph, American bluegrass musicians
- Thomas Stanley (author) (1625–1678), English author and translator
- Thomas Bahnson Stanley (1890–1970), American politician, governor of Virginia 1954–1958
- Venetia Stanley (1600–1633), English noblewoman
- Venetia Stanley (1887–1948), English socialite, intimate friend of H. H. Asquith
- Wendell Meredith Stanley (1904–1971), American biochemist, virologist, and Nobel prize laureate
- William Stanley (soldier) (c. 1435–1495), English soldier, fought at the Battle of Bosworth Field
- William Stanley (born 1548) (1548–1630), English military commander, under Queen Elizabeth I
- William Stanley (inventor), British inventor and businessman
- William Stanley Jr. (1858–1916), American physicist
- Winifred C. Stanley (1909–1996), U.S. Representative from New York
- Woodrow Stanley (1950–2022), American politician

=== English nobility and gentry ===
Arms of Stanley: Argent, on a bend azure three hart's (or buck's) heads cabossed or.

- any of the Stanley baronets
- any who held the title Baron Stanley
- any who held the title Baron Stanley of Alderley
- Albert Stanley, 1st Baron Ashfield (1874–1948), president of the Board of Trade, chairman of London Passenger Transport Board
- Anne Stanley, Countess of Ancram (1600–1656/7), wife of the 1st Earl of Ancram
- Edward Stanley, Lord Stanley, name used for several men: see Edward Stanley (disambiguation)
- Edward John Stanley, 6th Baron Sheffield and Stanley of Alderley (1907–1971)
- Henrietta Stanley, 4th Baroness Strange (1687–1718), English peeress
- Henry Stanley, 4th Earl of Derby (1531–1593)
- James Stanley, 7th Earl of Derby (1607–1651)
- Thomas Stanley, 1st Earl of Derby (1435–1504)
- William Stanley, 6th Earl of Derby (1584–1642)

== Fictional characters ==
- Stanley (Cars), the deceased founder of the town Radiator Springs in the Cars franchise
- Sappy Stanley, a character in the TV series Tiny Toon Adventures
- Stanley the Tool, in the webcomic Erfworld
- Stanley Hudson, a character on the TV show The Office
- Stanley Ipkiss, the main character in the comic and the film The Mask
- Stanley Kowalski, in A Streetcar Named Desire
- Stanley Lambchop, in Jeff Brown's Flat Stanley book series
- Stanley Marsh, one of the main characters from South Park
- Stanley Pines, on the animated TV series Gravity Falls
- Stanley Roper, on the American sitcom Three's Company
- Stanley Sorenson, in Brandon Mull's Fablehaven book series
- Stanley Tweedle, on the science fiction TV series Lexx
- Stanley Yelnats IV, from the novel and film Holes

== See also ==
- Stanley (disambiguation)
- Stanislav (given name)
