= Sheriff of Merionethshire =

Welsh county ceremonial officer

This is a list of Sheriffs of Merionethshire (or Sheriffs of Meirionnydd). The historic county of Merioneth was originally created in 1284. The administrative county of Merioneth was created from the historic county under the Local Government Act 1888.

A Sheriff is the legal representative of the monarch, and is appointed annually for each county in Wales and England. Their duty is to keep the peace in the county, and to ensure the country follows the law of the monarch. Originally, the job was a position of status and strength, but today it is principally a ceremonial role.

On 1 April 1974, under the provisions of the Local Government Act 1972, the shrievalties of Merionethshire, together with that of Anglesey and Caernarvonshire were abolished, being replaced by the new office of High Sheriff of Gwynedd.

== List of Sheriffs ==
=== 14th century ===
- 1392: Griffith ap Llewellyn
- c. 1400: Einion ap Ithel

=== 15th century ===
- 1413-1420: Thomas Strange
- 1423-1430: Robert Orell
- 1430-1432: Thomas Dankyson
- 1432-1460: Thomas Burneby
- 1434-1435: John Hampton
- 1453-1560: Thomas Parker
- 1461-1485: Roger Kynaston
- 1485-1509: Peter Stanley

=== 16th century ===
- 1515: Piers Stanley
- 1517: Ellis ap Maurice
- 1520: John Scudamore
- 1528: William Brereton
- 1533: William Brereton and John Puleston (jointly)
- 1536: John Puleston ("for life")
- 1541: Ellis ap Maurice of Clenennau
- 1542: Jenkin Vaughan, of Caethle
- 1543: John Powys, of Vaner
- 1544: Robert Salusbury of Bachymbyd
- 1544: Edward Stanley of Harlech
- 1545: Lewis ap Owen of Plas-yn-dre, Dolgellau
- 1546: Richard Mytton of Shrewsbury and Halston, Salop and Dinas Mawddwy, Merion
- 1546: Rhys Vaughan of Cors-y-Gedol in Llanddwywe
- 1547: Robert Salusbury of Bachymbyd
- 1549: Ieuan ap David Lloyd
- 1551: John ap Hugh ap Evan
- 1552: Ellis Price of Plas Iolyn
- 1552: Edward Stanley of Harlech
- 1553: Richard Mytton of Shrewsbury and Halston, Salop and Dinas Mawddwy, Merion (or Edward?)
- 1555: Lewis ap Owen of Plas-yn-dre, Dolgellau: assassinated by outlaws, 11 October 1555. Replaced by Rhys Vaughan
- 1556: Ellis Price of Plas Iolyn
- 1557: Rhys Vaughan of Cors-y-Gedol in Llanddwywe
- 1558: John David Lloyd
- 1559: John Salusbury of Rûg, Corwen and Bachymbyd, Denbighshire
- 1560: Edward Stanley of Harlech
- 1561: Hugh Puleston
- 1562: Ieuan ap David Lloyd of Cebwyn
- 1563: Griffith Glynne
- 1564: Ellis Price of Plas Iolyn
- 1565: Ellis ap William Lloyd
- 1566: John Lewis Owen of Llwyn, Dolgellau
- 1567: Griffith Glynne
- 1568: Ellis Price of Plas Iolyn
- 1569: Piers Salusbury
- 1570: Owen Wynne
- 1571: John Yerwerth
- 1572: John Gwynne ap Ellis of Moel Ifor, near Llanrhystyd, Cardiganshire
- 1573: John Lewis Owen of Llwyn, Dolgellau
- 1574: Ellis Price of Plas Iolyn
- 1575: Rowland Pugh the elder of Mathafarn, Llanwrin, Montgomeryshire
- 1576: Evan Lloyd David ap John of Nantmynach
- 1577: John Wyn ap Cadwaladr of Rhiwlas
- 1578: John Salusbury of Rûg, Corwen and Bachymbyd, Denbighshire
- 1579: Ellis Price of Plas Iolyn
- 1580: John Price of Gogerddan, Cardiganshire
- 1581: Evan Lloyd of Yale
- 1582: Rees Hughes of Maes-y-Pandy
- 1583: Richard ap Hugh ap Evan
- 1584: Ellis Price of Plas Iolyn
- 1585: Piers Salusbury
- 1586: John Wyn ap Cadwaladr of Rhiwlas
- 1587: Hugh Nanney the elder of Nannau
- 1588: Griffith Vaughan of Cors-y-gedol
- 1589: John Wynn of Gwydir
- 1590: John Lewis Owen of Llwyn, Dolgellau
- 1591: William Maurice of Clenennau
- 1592: Griffith Wynne of Berth Ddu
- 1593: Cadwaladr Price of Rhiwlas
- 1594: John Vaughan of Glanllyn
- 1595: Maurice Lewis of Festiniog
- 1596: Robert Lloyd of Rhiwgoch
- 1597: John Conwy
- 1598: Lewis Owen of Llwyn, Dolgellau
- 1599: Matthew Herbert of Dolguog, Machynlleth
- 1600: Piers Salesby

=== 17th century ===
- 1601: John Wynn, 1st Baronet of Gwydir, Caernarvonshire
- 1602: Robert Lloyd of Rhiwgoch
- 1603: Griffith Vaughan Corsygedol
- 1604: Thomas Vaughan Pantglas, Caernarfonshire
- 1605: Thomas Needham
- 1606: William Maurice of Clenennau
- 1607: Sir James Pryse Ynysmaengwyn
- 1608: Ednyfed Griffith of Gwydd-gwion
- 1609: John Price, Rhiwlas
- 1610: Matthew Herbert of Dolguog, Machynlleth, Montgomeryshire
- 1611: William Lewis Anwyl of Park, Llanfrothen (1st term)
- 1612: John Wynn the younger of Gwydir
- 1613: John Lloyd Faenol
- 1614: John Vaughan Caergai
- 1615: Robert Lloyd of Rhiwgoch
- 1616: John Lloyd of Rhiwaedog
- 1617: Lewis Gwyn of Dolaugwyn
- 1618: John Lewis, Ffestiniog
- 1618: William Wynn of Glyn (1st term)
- 1619: Humphrey Hughes of Gwerclas
- 1620: Sir James Pryse Ynysmaengwyn
- 1621: John Vaughan Caergai
- 1622: John Vaughan of Caethle
- 1623: Thomas Lloyd of Nantfreyr
- 1624: William Lewis Anwyl, Park, Llanfrothen (2 seasons)
- 1625: Robert Lloyd of Rhiwgoch
- 1626 Rowland Pugh
- 1626: William Vaughan Cors y Gedol
- 1627: Hugh Nanney of Nannau (1st term)
- 1628: Pierce Lloyd
- 1629: William Oxwicke, Coventry
- 1630: Henry Pryce of Taltreuddyn
- 1631: Robert Wynn
- 1631: Rowland Pugh
- 1632: John Owen of Clenenney
- 1633: Edmund Meyricke of Garthlwyd
- 1634: Lewis Nanney of Maes-y-pandy
- 1635: Evan Evans of Tanybwlch
- 1636: Richard Vaughan (of Corsygedol), died and replaced by John Lloyd of Rhiwaedog
- 1637: William Wynn of Glyn (2nd term)
- 1638: Hugh Nanney of Nanney (2nd term)
- 1639: Griffith Lloyd of Maes-y-neuadd
- 1640: Thomas Phillips Swydd Amwythig
- 1641: Lewis Anwyl of Cemmaes died and replaced by Griffith Nanney of Dolaugwyn
- 1642: John Lloyd of Rhiwaedog
- 1643 Griffith Nanney
- 1643: Rowland Vaughan Caergai
- 1644: John Morgan of Celli-Iorwerth
- 1645: William Owen, Brogyntyn, Cwnstabl Castle Harlech
- 1646: Lewis Owen
- 1647: Lewis Owen, Peniarth
- 1647: Maurice Williams of Nanmor
- 1648: Owen Salisbury of Rhûg
- 1649: Maurice Williams, Hafodgarregog
- 1649: Robert Anwyl of Park, Llanfrothen
- 1650: Hugh Nanney of Nannau (son of Hugh, HS 1626)
- 1650: Maurice Wynne of Crogen
- 1651: John Lloyd of Maes-y-Pandy
- 1651: Maurice Wynne Crogen
- 1652: John Lloyd Maesypandy
- 1653: Lewis Lloyd Rhiwaedog
- 1654: Morris Lewis
- 1655: John Anwyl of Llanfendigaid
- 1655: William Vaughan, Caethle
- 1656: John Anwyl Llanfendigaid
- 1656: Robert Wynn of Glyn and Ystumcegid (1st term)
- 1656: William Vaughan of Caethle
- 1657: Howel Vaughan, Glanllyn
- 1659–1660: Richard Anwyl (2 years)
- 1661: Humphrey Hughes of Gwerdas
- 1662: William Salesbury of Rhûg
- 1663: Roger Mostyn, Bkj., of Ddl-y-corslwyn
- 1664: John Wynne of Cwm-mine
- 1665: Lewis Lloyd, of Rhiwaedog
- 1665: Maurice Williams of Nanmor
- 1666: John Lloyd, of Maes-y-pandy
- 1667: Richard Wynn, of Branas
- 1668: Robert Wynn, of Glyn and Ystumcegid (2nd term)
- 1669: Charles Kiffin, of Crecoch
- 1669: John Vaughan
- 1671: Maurice Wynn of Moel-y-Glo
- 1672: Howel Vaughan of Vaner
- 1673: Nathanael Jones of Hendwr
- 1674: Owen Wynne of Glyn
- 1675: Hugh Tudyr of Eglyn
- 1676: John Wynn, 5th Baronet of Gwydir and Rhiwgoch and Wynnstay, Denbighshire.
- 1677: Griffith Vaughan Cors y Gedol
- 1678: John Nanney of Llanfendigaid
- 1679: Robert Wynn of Maes-y-Neuadd (son of Maurice, HS 1671)
- 1680: Richard Nanney of Cefn-deuddwr
- 1681: Edmund Meyrick of Ucheldre
- 1682: William Vaughan Caergai
- 1683 Robert Pew
- 1683: Vincent Corbet, Ynysmaengwyn
- 1684: Maurice Jones of Hendwr; died and replaced by Anthony Thomas of Hendre
- 1685 Maurice Jones, Hendwr
- 1685: Lewis Lewis Penmaen
- 1686: Richard Poole of Caenest
- 1687: Richard Mytton Dinas Mawddwy
- 1688 John Jones, Uwchlaw'r Coed
- 1688: Robert Owen, Kt., of Glyn
- 1689: Charles Hughes of Gwerclas
- 1690: John Jones Uwchlaw'rcoed
- 1691: John Grosvenor died and was replaced by Hugh Nanney of Nannau
- 1691: Hugh Nanney Nannau
- 1692: Oliver Thomas, Bala
- 1692: Thomas Owen Llynlloedd
- 1693: Owen Wynne Pengwern
- 1694: William Anwyl Dolfriog
- 1695: Richard Owen Peniarth
- 1696: John Lloyd Aberllefenni
- 1697: Howel Vaughan Flag
- 1698: Richard Vaughan of Cors-y-gedol
- 1699: Morris Jones
- 1699: William Lewis Anwyl Park
- 1700: Evan Wynne of Cwm-mine
- 1700: William Lewis Anwyl of Park

=== 18th century ===
- 1701: John Nanney of Llanfendigaid
- 1702: Edward Holland of Pentre
- 1703: David Lloyd of Hendwr
- 1704: Morris Williams of Hafod-garegog
- 1705: John Lloyd of Rhwiwaedog
- 1706: William Williams, 2nd Baronet, of Llanforda, Oswestry
- 1707: Griffith Williams, of Marie
- 1708: John Wynne of Garthmeilio
- 1709: John Vaughan of Caergai
- 1710: Roger Price of Rhiwlas
- 1711: Thomas Meyrick, of Berthllwyd
- 1712: Hugh Owen of Cae'rberllan
- 1713: William Owen of Glyn
- 1714: William Wynn of Maes-y-Neuadd (son of Robert, HS 1679)
- 1715: Lewis Owen of Peniarth
- 1716: John Evans of Cyffty
- 1717: Richard Weaver of Corwen
- 1718: Griffith Wynne of Taltreuddyn
- 1719: Ellis Jones of Nant-bydyr
- 1720: Hugh Hughes of Gwerclas and Bryntangor
- 1721: Richard Mytton of Dinas Mawddwy
- 1722: Thomas Price of Glyn
- 1723: David Lloyd of Bodnant
- 1724: Giwn Lloyd of Hendwr
- 1725: Robert Lloyd of Dolglessyn
- 1726: Athelstan Owen of Rhiwaedog
- 1727: William Wynn of Taltreuddyn
- 1728: John Nanney of Maes-y-Pandy
- 1729: Griffith Roberts of Blaen-y-ddol
- 1730: Ffoulk Lloyd of Cilau
- 1731: William Price of Rhiwlas
- 1732: Edward Lloyd of Plymog (Gwerclas)
- 1733: Hugh Thomas of Heodre
- 1734: Robert Wynn of Maes-y-Neuadd (son of William, HS 1714)
- 1735: Robert Vaughan, of Hencwrt
- 1736: John Mytton of Dinas Mawddwy
- 1737: Robert Meyrick of Ucheldre
- 1738: John Lloyd, of Vachddeiliog (Rhiwaedog)
- 1739: Richard Anwyl of Dolfeiniog
- 1740: Thomas Pryse of Gogerddan
- 1741: Robert Wynne of Cwm-mine
- 1742: Robert Griffith of Plas, Tan-y-Bwlch
- 1743: Maurice Jones of Ddol
- 1744: William Lewis Anwyl of Bod talog
- 1745: Edward Williams of Peniarth
- 1746: Thomas Edward of Pentry
- 1746: Robert Parry of Goppa
- 1747: Hugh Hughes Lloyd of Plymog and Gwerclas
- 1748: Owen Wynne Pengwern, Festiniog
- 1749: Owen Holland of Pentremawr
- 1750: William Wynn of Park
- 1751: Maysmore Maurice of Rhagatt
- 1752: Hugh Vaughan of Hencwrt
- 1753: Robert Price of Caecoch
- 1754: John Mostyn of Clegir
- 1755: William Humphreys of Maerdy
- 1756: Richard Owen, of Caethley
- 1757: Peter Price of Dolgammedd
- 1758: William Wynne of Maes-y-neuadd (son of Robert, HS 1734)
- 1759: Humphrey Edwards, of Talgarth
- 1760: Robert Vaughan Humphreys of Caerynwch
- 1761: Lewis Owen of Cae'rberllan
- 1762: Robert Wynne of Cwm-mine
- 1763: John Mytton of Dinas Mawddwy
- 1764: William Lloyd of Rhiwaedog
- 1765: John Pugh of Garthmaelan
- 1766: Edward Vaughan Pugh, of Ty-gwyn
- 1767: Thomas Kyffin of Bryn-yr-odyn
- 1768: Robert Godolphe Owen of Glyn
- 1769: Rice James of Dol-y-gelynen
- 1770: Evan Griffydd of Tan-y-Bwlch
- 1771: Richard Parry of Goppa
- 1772: William Wynne of Peniarth and Park
- 1773: Lewis Edwards of Talgarth
- 1774: Thomas Powel of Bron-biban
- 1775: Lewis Nanney of Llwyn
- 1776: William Williams, of Peniarth-uchaf
- 1777: John Vaughan of Dol-melynllyn
- 1778: Richard Tavistock Watkin (a.k.a. Richard Price)
- 1779: Henry Arthur Corbet of Ynys-y-maengwyn
- 1780: Thomas Roberts of Tan-y-gaer
- 1781: Edward Lloyd
- 1782: William Humffreys of Maerdy
- 1783: Robert Evans of Bodweni, Bala
- 1784: David Roberts replaced by Robert Howell Vaughan of Hafod Owen
- 1785: John Jones
- 1786: Griffith Pryse of Corsygarnedd,
- 1787: John Jones of Rhydyfen
- 1788: Griffith Evans of Cwm-yr-afon
- 1789: Edward Lloyd, of Palan
- 1790: John Wynne Pugh of Garth-maelan
- 1791: Robert Griffiths of Bodunlliw
- 1792: Edward Corbet of Ynys-y-maengwyn
- 1793: William John Lenthall of Uchel-dre
- 1794: Owen Ormsby of Glyn
- 1795: Robert Lloyd of Cefn Coed
- 1796: Edward Lloyd, 1st Baron Mostyn of Park, replaced by Thomas Lloyd of Cwmheision
- 1797: Bell Lloyd of Tyddyn Llan
- 1798: Robert Watkin Wynne of Garthmeilio, Corwen
- 1799: Thomas Mostyn, 6th Baronet of Mostyn, Flintshire and Gloddaeth, Caernarvonshire
- 1800: Bulkley Hatchet, of Carnygadell

=== 19th century ===
- 11 February 1801: Jonathan Passingham, of Hendwr
- 3 February 1802: John Meredith Mostyn, of Clegir
- 3 February 1803: Hugh Owen Hatchet, of Carnygadell
- 16 February 1803: John Forbes, of Cefn-bodig
- 1 February 1804: Edward Pryce Lloyd, 1st Baron Mostyn, of Pengwern Place (Park)
- 6 February 1805: John Edwards, of Penrhyn
- 1 February 1806: Hugh Jones Sr. of Dolgelly
- 5 March 1806: Thomas Jones, of Dolgelly
- 4 February 1807: Richard Henry Kenrick, of Ucheldre
- 3 February 1808: Lewis Price Edwards, of Talgarth
- 6 February 1809: William Davies, of Ty-uchaf
- 31 January 1810: John Davies, of Aberllefenni
- 8 February 1811: Hugh Reveley, of Bryn-y-gwin
- 24 January 1812: William Wynne, of Peniarth
- 10 February 1813: Thomas Edwards, of Ty Isaf
- 4 February 1814: William Gryffydd Oakeley, of Plas Tan-y-bwlch
- 13 February 1815: John Vaughan, of Penmaen Dyfi
- 1816: Thomas Duckenfield Ashley, of Cwmllecoidig
- 1816: John Davies, of Fron-haulog,
- 1817: John Evans, Kt., of Hendre-forfydd
- 1818: John Edwards of Cocd-y-bedw
- 1819: Edward Owen of Garth-yngharad
- 1820: Thomas Fitzhugh of Cwm-heision
- 1821: John Mytton of Halston, Salop. (Mad Jack Mytton)
- 1822: James Gill, of Pant Glas
- 1823: John Wynne of Cwmein
- 1824: Athelstan Corbet of Ynysymaengwyn
- 1825: Francis Roberts of Gerddi-bluog
- 1826: William Casson of Cynfel
- 1827: Thomas Hartley of Llwyn
- 1828: T. Casson of Blaenddôl
- 1829: William John Bankes of Dol-y-moch
- 1830: Jones Panton, of Llwyngwern
- 1831: Hugh Lloyd, of Cefnbodig
- 1832: William Turner, of Croesor
- 1833: George Jonathan Scott, of Peniartbucha
- 1834: Charles Grey Harford, of Bryntirion
- 1835: John Henry Lewis, of Dolgun
- 1836: John Ellerker Boulcott, of Hendreissa
- 1837: Robert Vaughan, 2nd Baronet, of Nannau House
- 1838: John Manners Kerr, of Plas Issa
- 1839: Edward Mostyn Lloyd-Mostyn, of Plashen
- 1840: George Pryce Lloyd, of Plas-yn-Dre
- 1841: John Williams, of Bron Eryri
- 1842: Thomas Pryce Lloyd, of Mochras
- 1843: Owen Jones Ellis Nanney, of Cefnddeuddwr
- 1844: David White Griffith, of Sygun
- 1845: Richard Watkin Price, of Rhiwlas
- 1846: Robert Vaughan, 3rd Baronet, of Nannau House
- 1847: John Griffith Griffith, of Taltreuddyn fawr
- 1848: Hugh Jones, of Gwernddelwa
- 1849: Robert Davies Jones, of Aberllefenni
- 1850: Edward Humphrey Griffith, of Gwastadfryn
- 1851: Henry Richardson, of Aberhirnant
- 1852: George Casson, of Blaenyddol
- 1853: Thomas Arthur Bertie Mostyn, of Kylan
- 1854: George Augustus Huddart, of Plasnpenrhyn
- 1855: Charles John Tottenham, of Berwyn House, near Llangollen
- 1856: John Priestley, of Hafodygregoge
- 1857: John Nanney, of Maesyneuadd
- 1858: Edward Buckley, of Plasyndinas
- 1859: Hugh John Reveley, of Brynygwin
- 1860: David Williams, of Deudraeth Castle was initially appointed, but was replaced by Charles Frederick Thruston, of Talgarth Hall
- 1861: David Williams, of Deudraeth Castle
- 1862: Samuel Holland, of Plas-yn-Penrhyn
- 1863: Howel Morgan, of Hengwrtuchaf
- 1864: Lewis Williams, of Vronwnion
- 1865: Richard Meredyth Richards, of Caerynwch
- 1866: John Corbet, of Ynysymaengwyn
- 1867: William Watkin Edward Wynne of Peniarth
- 1868: Richard John Lloyd Price, of Rhiwlas
- 1869: Henry Robertson, of Crogen
- 1870: Clement Arthur Thruston, of Pennal Towers
- 1871: Herbert Francis Shuker, of Ty Mawr, Towyn
- 1872: Charles Reynolds Williams, of Dolmelynllyn
- 1873: Charles Henry Wynn, of Rhug
- 1874: William Edward Oakeley, of Plas Tanybwlch, Maentwrog
- 1875: Athelstan John Soden Corbet of Ynysmaengwyn
- 1876: Thomas Taylor, of The Cliff
- 1877: Hugh Ellis-Nanney
- 1878: William John Beale, of "Bryntirion", Dolgelly
- 1879: David Davis of Tynycoed, Dolgelly
- 1880: John Vaughan of Nannau House
- 1881: Phillips Lloyd Fletcher, of Nerquis Hall, Mold
- 1882: Charles Reynolds Williams, of Dolmelynllyn, Dolgelly
- 1883: David William Kirkby, of Maes-y-neuadd, Talsarnau
- 1884: John Ernest Greaves of Plasweunydd, Festiniog
- 1885: Richard Henry Wyatt, of Gartbyngharad
- 1886: William Robert Maurice Wynne, of Peniarth, Towyn
- 1887: Edward Evans-Lloyd of Moel y Garnedd, Bala
- 1888: Griffith Williams, of Borthwnog, Dolgelly
- 1889: Richard Henry Wood, of Pantglas, Trawsfynydd
- 1890: Charles Edward Jones Owen of Hengwrtucha, Dolgelly
- 1891: Edward Owen Vaughan Lloyd of Rhagatt, Corwen
- 1892:Henry Beyer Robertson, of Pale, Corwen, Kt.
- 1893: Edward Robert Jenkins, of Bodwenni, Llandderfel, Corwen
- 1894: William Ansell of Corsygedol, Dyffryn
- 1895: John Leigh Taylor, of the Cliffe, Dolgelley, Esq.
- 1896: Charles Williams, of Hengwm, Dyffryn,
- 1897: Edward Owen Vaughan Lloyd, of Rhagatt, near Corwen,
- 1898: William Patchett, of Allt Fawr, Barmoutli
- 1899: Richard Edward Lloyd Richards, of Caerynwch, Dolgelley
- 1900: Robert Charles Anwyl, of Llugwy, Machynlleth

=== 20th century ===
- 1901: Robert Prys Owen, of Aelybryn, Dyffryn
- 1902: Romer Williams, of Dolmelynllyn, Dolgelley
- 1903: Harold Finch-Hatton, of Plas, Harlech
- 1904: Thomas Edwards, of Blaenau, Dolgelley
- 1905: George Henry Ellis, of Pen-y-Mount, Festiniog
- 1906: Athelstane Robert Pryce, of Aberllefenny, Corris
- 1907: Charles Gabriel Beale, of Bryntirion, Dolgelley
- 1908: George Frederick Scott, of Penmaenucha, Dolgelley
- 1909: William Blakeway Burton, of Eryl Aran, Bala
- 1910: Henry Meredyth Richards, of Caerynwch, Dolgelley
- 1911: Lewis Owen Williams, of Borthwnog, Dolgelley
- 1912: Thomas Howell William Idris, of Dolycae, Talyllyn, Corris
- 1913: John Jones of Wenallt, Dolgelley
- 1914: John Morris of Glanffrwrd Hall, Llanbedr
- 1915: Richard Thomas Jones, of Pen-y-garth, Harlech
- 1916: William Owen Roberts, of Cefn, Corwen and Rockfield, Wavertree, Liverpool
- 1917: Howell Jones Williams, of "Penrhyn", Camden Road, London
- 1918: Robert Davies Evans, of Llys Meddyg, Blaenau Festiniog
- 1919: Evan Vincent Evans of Rhydfelin, Trawsfyndd, and Chancery Lane, London, WC2, Kt.
- 1920: Owen Morgan Owen, of 13, St. Petersburgh Place, London, W2
- 1921: Thomas Williams-Piggott of Fronaig, Barmouth
- 1922: William Owen of Plasweunydd, Blaenau Festiniog
- 1923: Robert David Roberts of Hafryn, Corwen
- 1924: Evan Jones of Plas Cwmorthin, B1aenau Festiniog
- 1925: Robert Townshend Anwyl-Passingham, of Bryn-y-Groes, Bala
- 1926: John Cadwaladr Roberts of Wernddu, Llanuwchllyn, Merioneth
- 1927: William Evans Thomas of Coedladwr, Llanwchllyn
- 1928: Charles Llewelyn Wynne-Jones of Penmaenucha, Dolgelly
- 1929: Thomas Humphrey Jones, of Penygarth, Harlech
- 1930: Owen Daniel Jones, of Talgarth, Pennal, Maehynlleth,
- 1931: Frank Lloyd, of Waterloo House, Corwen, and Northwood, Lome Boad, Oxton
- 1933: William Fergusson Irvine of Brynllwyn, Corwen
- 1934: Thomas Lloyd Jones of 3, The Terrace, Corwen
- 1935: Alexander Cox Patterson of Hafodybryn, Llanbedr
- 1936: Henry Robertson of Fronheulog, Llandderfel
- 1937: William Hamilton Hall Johnston of Bryn-y-Groes, Bala
- 1938: Charles Phibbs of Plas Gwynfryn, Llanbedr
- 1939: Arthur Edward Campbell Lloyd Jones-Lloyd of Moelygarnedd, Bala
- 1940: Ralph Thompson Cooke of Aber Artro, Llanbedr
- 1941: Robert Richard Jones of Tremeivon, Talsarna
- 1942: John Edmund Thomas of Bronwydd, Festiniog
- 1943: Harry Joyce of Coed-y-Glyn, Penhelig, Aberdyfi
- 1944: John Llewelyn Davies of Tanybryn, Barmouth
- 1945: David Peter Oliver of "Cae-Ednyfed", Minflordd, Penrhyndeudraeth
- 1946: John Barrow Parry of Bodiwan, Bala
- 1947: William Clayton Russon of Glan-y-Mawddach, near Barmouth
- 1948: Lewis Williams of Awelon, Barmouth
- 1949: Alfred Ernest Hughes of Brynhyfryd, Dolgelley
- 1950: Cyril Lewis Ricketts of Plas Cae'rmeddyg, Llanbedr
- 1951: David Tudor of "Dilwyn", Trawsfynydd
- 1952: William Llewelyn Davies, of Sherborne House, Aberystwyth
- 1953: David Morris Tudor of Bronwylfa, Bryncrug, Towyn
- 1954: Lewis Noel Vincent Evans of Gwylfa, Harlech
- 1955: Charles Morris Jones of Brynmelyn, Bala
- 1956: Eric Ommanney Skaife of Dolserau, Dolgelley
- 1957: Charles Hilary Vaughan Vaughan of Nannau, Dolgelley
- 1958: Lieut.-Colonel Kenrick Jack Price, of Rhiwlas, Bala
- 1959: Duncan Robertson of Llantysilio Hall, Llangollen, Denbighshire
- 1960: Richard Meredyth Richards, of Coed, Dolgellau
- 1961: Thomas Matson Roberts, of Penmaen, Dolgellau.
- 1962: Harloe Phibbs, of Penrallt, Llanbedr.
- 1963: Michael Wynn, 7th Baron Newborough, of Rhug Estate, Corwen.
- 1964: Vernon Harcourt Williams of Hendre Hall, Penrhyndeudraeth.
- 1965: Sir (William) Clayton Russon, of Glan-y-Mawddach, Barmouth.
- 1966: David Rowe Cooke of Plas Nantcol, Llanbedr, Merioneth.
- 1967: Edward Roger Nanney-Wynn, of Llanfendigaid, Towyn
- 1968: Owain Merfyn Prichard, of Tristan, Penrhyndeudraeth
- 1969: Robert William Manners, of Bryntirion, Corwen.
- 1970: John Evans Tudor, of Bryn Adda, Dolgellau.
- 1971: Herbert Francis Shuker, of Ty Mawr, Towyn.
- 1972: Henry Herman Evelyn Montagu Winch, of Castle Barn, Minffardd, Penrhyndeudraeth.
- 1973: Gladys Nellie Russon, (née Markham) of Glan-y-Mawddach, near Barmouth.
- 1974 onwards – See High Sheriff of Gwynedd
