= Stan Ross =

Stan(ley) Ross may refer to:

- Ysaiah Ross, educator
- Stanley Ralph Ross (1935–2000), American writer, announcer and comedian
- Stan Ross (studio executive), co-owner of Gold Star Studios
- Stanley Ross, American indie songwriter
- Stan Ross (lacrosse), American lacrosse coach
