= Stan (given name) =

- Pronunciation: /ˈstæn/
- Gender: Male

Other names
- Related names: Stanley, Stanislav, Stanford

Stan is a masculine given name originating as a short form (hypocorism) of names such as Stanley, Stanislav and Stanford. Notable people with the name include:

- Stan Blake (born 1954), American politician
- Stanley Stan Brakhage (1933–2003), American filmmaker
- Stanley Stan Coveleski (1880–1984), American Major League Baseball pitcher born Stanislaus Kowalewski
- Stan Davis (disambiguation)
- Stanley Stan Fairbairn (1886–1943), Australian rules footballer
- Stanley Stan Galazin (1915–1989), American National Football League player
- Stanley Stan Getz (1927–1991), American jazz saxophonist
- Stan Ghițescu (1881–1952), Romanian politician and government minister
- Stan Grant (journalist) (born 1963), Australian journalist
- Stanley Stan Grant (Wiradjuri elder) (born 1940), elder of the Wiradjuri tribe of Indigenous Australians
- Stanley Stan Heath (born 1964), American college basketball coach
- Stanley Stan Heath (gridiron football) (1927–2010), American football quarterback
- Stanley Stan Heptinstall (born 1946), British academic and politician
- Stanley Stan Isaacs (1929–2013), American sportswriter and columnist
- Stan Jones (disambiguation)
- Stanley Stan Kenton (1911–1979), American jazz pianist, composer and arranger
- Stanfield Stan Lane (born 1953), American retired pro wrestler and commentator
- Stan Laurel (1890–1965), English comic actor, writer and film director, half of comedy duo Laurel and Hardy, born Arthur Stanley Jefferson
- Stan Lee (1922–2018), American comic-book writer, editor, publisher, media producer, television host, actor and former president and chairman of Marvel Comics, born Stanley Lieber
- Stanley Stan Love (basketball) (1949–2025), American former National Basketball Association player
- Stanley Stan Mortensen (1921–1991), English footballer
- Constant Stan Ockers (1920–1956), Belgian racing cyclist
- Stanley Stan Olejniczak (1912–1979), American National Football League player
- Stan Mikita (1940–2018), Slovak-Canadian Hall-of-Fame National Hockey League player born Stanislav Gvoth
- Stanley Stan Musial (1920–2013), American Hall-of-Fame Major League Baseball player born Stanisław Franciszek Musia
- Stan Ioan Pătraș (1908–1977), Romanian wood sculptor
- Stanley Stan Rogers (1949–1983), Canadian folk singer and songwriter
- Stanley Stan Rosen (1906–1984), American NFL football player
- Stan Ross (disambiguation)
- Stan Shaver (1948–2024), American politician
- Stan Shaw (born 1952), American actor
- Stan Smith (disambiguation)
- Stanislaus Stan Storimans (1969–2008), Dutch photojournalist killed in the 2008 Russo-Georgian War
- Stan Thomas (disambiguation)
- Stan Vanderbeek (1927–1984), American experimental filmmaker
- Stanislas Stan Wawrinka (born 1985), Swiss tennis player
- Stanley Stan White (linebacker) (born 1949), American former National Football League player
- Stan White (quarterback) (born 1971), American former National Football League player
- Stan White (politician), North Carolina state senator (2011–2012)
- Stan Williams (disambiguation)
- Stanley Stan Wright (rugby union) (born 1978), Cook Islands international rugby union player
- Stanley Stan Wright (track coach) (1921–1998), first black head coach of a United States track and field team
- Stan Wright (Australian rules footballer) (1918–1992), Australian rules footballer
