= Matthew Herbert (disambiguation) =

Matthew Herbert (born 1972) is a British musician.

Matthew Herbert may also refer to:

- Matthew Herbert (died 1603), Welsh MP
- Matthew Herbert (died 1611) (1563–1611), MP
