= Edward Stanley (MP for Merioneth) =

16th-century Welsh politician

Edward Stanley (by 1513 – 1564 or later), of Harlech, Merionethshire, was a Welsh politician and member of the Parliament of England.

== Family and education ==
Stanley was the second son of Peter Stanley of Flint, Flintshire and his wife, Janet née Butler, a daughter of Sir Thomas Butler. He was educated at Oxford University, achieving a Bachelor of Arts on 2 July 1526. Stanley married Ellen, an illegitimate daughter of Meredydd ap Ievan ap Robert of Dolwyddelan and Gwydir, Caernarvonshire. Stanley was the brother-in-law of John Wynn ap Meredydd, MP for Caernarvonshire.

== Career ==
He was a Member (MP) of the Parliament of England for Merioneth in 1542. He was Sheriff of Merionethshire in 1544–45, 1552–53 and 1559–60.

Parliament of England
Preceded by ? ?	Member of Parliament for Merioneth; 1542; With: ?	Succeeded by Rhys Vaughan ?
