= Edward Smith-Stanley =

Edward Smith-Stanley may refer to:

- Edward Smith-Stanley, 12th Earl of Derby (1752–1834), English politician
- Edward Smith-Stanley, 13th Earl of Derby (1775–1851), English politician and son of the above
- Edward Smith-Stanley, 14th Earl of Derby (1799–1869), son of the above, Prime Minister of the United Kingdom

== See also ==
- Edward Stanley (disambiguation)
- Earl of Derby
