= Edward Stanley =

Edward Stanley may refer to:

- Edward Stanley, 1st Baron Monteagle (c. 1460–1523), English soldier and peer
- Edward Stanley, 3rd Earl of Derby (1509–1572), English nobleman
- Edward Stanley (MP for Merioneth) (by 1513–64 or later), member of parliament (MP) for Merioneth
- Edward Stanley (MP for Flint Boroughs) (1521/22?–1609), MP for Flint Boroughs
- Edward Stanley (1639–1664), member of parliament for Lancashire
- Edward Stanley, 11th Earl of Derby (1689–1776), British peer and politician
- Edward Stanley (bishop) (1779–1849), Bishop of Norwich
- Edward Stanley (1790–1863), member of parliament for West Cumberland, 1832–1852
- Edward Stanley (surgeon) (1793–1862), author of books on surgery, twice president of the Royal College of Surgeons of England
- Edward Stanley, 2nd Baron Stanley of Alderley (1802–1869), British politician
- Edward Stanley, 15th Earl of Derby (1826–1893), British statesman, twice Secretary of State for Foreign Affairs
- Edward Stanley (Bridgwater MP) (1826–1907), member of parliament for West Somerset and Bridgwater
- Edward Stanley, 4th Baron Stanley of Alderley (1839–1925), English educationalist
- Edward Stanley (cricketer) (1852–1896), English cricketer
- Edward Stanley, 17th Earl of Derby (1865–1948), British soldier, Conservative politician, diplomat and racehorse owner
- Edward Stanley, Lord Stanley (died 1938) (1894–1938), British Conservative politician
- Edward Stanley, 6th Baron Stanley of Alderley (1907–1971), English nobleman
- Edward Stanley, 18th Earl of Derby (1918–1994), British peer
- Edward Stanley, 19th Earl of Derby (born 1962), British peer
- Edward Stanley (born 1998), son of the 19th Earl of Derby

== See also ==
- Edward Smith-Stanley (disambiguation), several people
- Edward Stanly, American lawyer and politician
