= Giwn Lloyd =

Welsh squire

Giwn Lloyd, 18th Baron of Hendwr (1699–1774) and squire of Tyfos, in the county of Merioneth and of Gwersyllt Park and Plas Newydd, in the county of Denbigh, was a Welsh gentleman who lived in the 18th century and was notorious for his dissolute life. He is best remembered for the lengthy court battle which ensued after his death, lasting over twenty years, exhausting the finances of many of his kinsmen, and shocking much of Welsh society.

== Early life ==
Giwn was born in 1699 in Llandrillo-yn-Edeirnion, the son and heir of David Lloyd of Hendwr, 17th Baron of Hendwr (1668–1707) who was High Sheriff of Merionethshire in 1703. He was named after his 15th century ancestor, Y Giwn Lloyd. His father David was the son of Thomas Lloyd of Tyfos (son of Rowland Lloyd ap Thomas Lloyd ap Rowland Lloyd ap David Lloyd ap Rhydderch ap David Goch ap Thomas ap Ieuan ap David ap Ieuan ap Giwn Lloyd (d. 1425), Baron of Hendwr and a descendant of Owain Brogyntyn. His father, David, had been left Hendwr by his uncle, Maurice Jones, 16th Baron (1654–1684), son and heir of Nathanael Jones of Hendwr (1624–1683), who were kinsmen of his, also descended from Owain Brogyntyn.

== Career ==
On 15 January 1720 he was admitted to Inner Temple (although he did not progress to the bar), which began his love affair with London and he began living a Hogarthian life. In 1730 he was described by the rural dean of Merionethshire as "a profligate, young rake, who, not withstanding, affects gaiety of dress beyond any woman". In London he frequented the Thatched House Tavern, St. James's Street, a notorious Tory clubhouse, whose members included Walpole and many leading Tories of the day. This was satirised by Jonathan Swift, who was also a member, in the lines "The Deanery-house may well be matched, / Under correction, with the Thatch'd".

During his lifetime he gathered the reputation, as was later told to the Jury in the court case, of having ‘addicted himself…to a very debauched dissipated and extravagant life’ and he ‘was peculiarly devoted to women and he had…the reputation of having natural children by these women’.

Despite living mostly in London, in later life, he exercised his responsibilities as a squire in Merionethshire, serving as a Justice of the Peace and High Sheriff in 1724. He was eventually married on 12 March 1746 to Sarah Hill, sister to Sir Rowland Hill, 1st Baronet of Hawkstone, receiving an enormous dowry of £8,000, but had no issue by her.

In North Wales, he was friends with Sir Watkin Williams-Wynn, 3rd Baronet, who granted him the Freedom of the City of Chester on 20 November 1736 (during which year he was Mayor) and Giwn may have shared his Jacobite sympathies and may have been in his Cycle Club of the White Rose.

Giwn died in 1776, aged 77, and was buried in Llandrillo Church, where there is an elaborate memorial to him (now hidden behind the organ, due to the influence of the Passinghams who were later Churchwardens of the parish).

== Lawsuits 1794–1827 ==
When Giwn died in 1774 he had left the estate to his two elderly sisters and thereafter intended for the estate to go to his kinsmen at Gwerclas, as neither of the Lloyds had any children. However, in 1794 a man claiming to be Giwn's legitimate heir began a plan to seize the estate.

Giwn Lloyd had apparently had an illegitimate daughter by Elizabeth Taylor, a barmaid who worked at the Thatched-House Tavern in St. James's. Their supposed daughter Elizabeth had married Robert Passingham, a tenant-farmer of Heston, Middlesex in 1762. This daughter of Elizabeth Taylor's (and possible Giwn's) Elizabeth was baptised 27 September 1741 at St. Pancras, London, and spent her whole life at Heston in Middlesex where she was eventually buried on 30 October 1774. However Robert and Elizabeth Passingham's sons, Jonathan and Robert, claimed that Giwn had in fact married Elizabeth Taylor, the bar maid, and that as such he was the rightful heir of Hendwr. Robert Passingham bribed the curate, Mr Sawyer, at St. Pancras to forge the entries of a marriage between Giwn and Elizabeth and also change their daughter's baptism name from Elizabeth Taylor to Elizabeth Lloyd.

The next part of the Passingham's plan was to make Giwn's elderly sisters recognise them as their great-nephews and heirs. Giwn's elder sister, Miss Catherine Lloyd, had died in 1787, aged 90. The Passinghams again forged a document to prove this and they then began an action of ejectment against Miss Mary Lloyd, at the age of 91, in 1794. Mr Garrow, the counsel for Miss Mary Lloyd of Hendwr, omitted to call any witnesses to disprove the forgeries despite there being about 40 witnesses willing to do this, as Richard Hughes Lloyd of Gwerclas later writes in his manuscript. Despite the two Lloyd sisters leaving their estates to the Gwerclas family, the Passinghams obtained Hendwr in 1794 at the Shrewsbury Assizes and Miss Mary Lloyd was ejected from Hendwr and died in 1798 aged 95.

This caused outrage throughout the whole of North Wales. Hendwr had been continuously owned by the same family since 11th century and suddenly a man with no connection to the area or people had seized the estate and ejected a 91-year-old spinster from her home – Richard Hughes Lloyd writes pathetically, of Mr Passingham, "God forgive him". Immediately after the ruling, in 1795, Jonathan Passingham (1763–1835) petitioned the College of Arms for his own coat of arms and for permission to quarter his new arms with those of Lloyd of Hendwr – polemically stating his victory in obtaining Hendwr.

The neighbouring gentry and kinsman all did what they could over the next two decades to try to reclaim the estate. In 1807 John Lloyd of Gwerclas received an anonymous letter informing him that the decision of the Shrewsbury Assizes had been obtained by forgery and he began a new notice of ejectment against Jonathan Passingham. Jonathan however had passed the estate on to his brother, Robert, who was married and had children which complicated the legal proceedings. The trial was delayed until 1818 and continued by Richard Hughes Lloyd of Gwerclas, the courts unanimously reversed the decision. Robert Passingham, at the time of this new trial, was already in Newgate Prison on a separate charge of fraud. He would have been hanged but died suddenly in his cell in prison. By this time the legal expenses had reached thousands and this completely bankrupted the Hughes-Lloyd of Gwerclas family who were forced to sell their estate in 1824 which was bought by the Rhug Estate.

Richard Hughes Lloyd died, like Miss Mary Lloyd, defeated by the Passinghams. He left money and instructions for his son Richard Walmsley Lloyd to continue legal proceedings against the Passinghams, however he eventually accepted £10,000 from the Passinghams in return for relinquishing his claim to Hendwr. The Passingham family continued to augment their gains in North Wales by marrying an heiress of the Anwyl family and became the Anwyl-Passingham family.

== See also ==
- Barons of Hendwr
- Nathanael Jones of Hendwr
- Owain Brogyntyn
