= Clayton Russon =

Anglo-Welsh industrialist and businessman (1895-1968)

Sir Clayton Russon OBE
- Born: William Clayton Russon; June 30, 1895; Merionethshire, Wales, United Kingdom
- Died: April 16, 1968 (aged 72)
- Occupation(s): Industrialist, businessman

Sir William Clayton Russon, OBE (30 June 1895 – 16 April 1968), commonly known by his middle name Clayton, was an Anglo-Welsh industrialist and businessman.

== Early life and family ==
William Clayton Russon was born on 30 June 1895, the son of William Clayton Russon and his wife Gertrude Emma, née James. His parents owned the Gartheiniog quarry between 1921 and 1934.

The family lived at Selly Park in Warwickshire, but, according to the Dictionary of Welsh Biography, Gertrude Russon had Welsh ancestry.

== Career ==
After leaving King Edward VI School in Birmingham, Russon established his own radio business. In 1932, he bought R. & G. Cuthbert, of Waltham Cross, a company which grew plants, especially roses; by the late 1930s, the firm was selling seeds and in 1940 Russon had it relocated to Dolgellau, then Barmouth and then Llangollen in c. 1942. According to The Times, Russon and his wife "soon worked it up into a thriving mail order with a fine reputation for quality and keen prices"; he wrote a piece on horticulture for The Times – "Mr. Cuthbert's Column" – which carried on for 1,680 issues up to the week before Russon's death.

As his business interests in Wales expanded, Russon became more involved in the public sphere of the country. During and after the Second World War, he took a keen interest in the reorganisation and recovery of Welsh industry especially. In 1939, he took up the chairmanship of the Merioneth National Savings Committee, serving until 1947.

In 1944, he became the founding chairman of the North Wales Industrial Society, and then became President of the Industrial Association of Wales and Monmouthshire three years later.

== Recognition ==
In 1946, Russon was appointed a Member of the Order of the British Empire (MBE); the next year, he served as the first President of the Llangollen International Eisteddfod, while also being High Sheriff of Merionethshire for the 1947–48 year. He remained on the Council for Wales and Monmouthshire from 1949 to 1963, and in 1952 he was promoted to Officer of the Order of the British Empire (OBE).

In 1958 – the year he became a Member of the Development Corporation for Wales (serving for five years) – Russon was knighted for his contribution to Welsh public life. That year he was also President of Gŵyl Gwerin Cymru (the Festival of Wales). Among his last public appointments was his posting as High Sheriff for Merionethshire for the second time in 1965.

Russon was chairman of a number of seed companies in addition to Cuthbert's. He was an Officer (1960), Commander (1962) and then Knight (1968) of the Order of St John, and a Freeman of the City of London.

== Death and legacy ==
He died on 16 April 1968. According to The Times, Russon was "a classic example of a man who through sheer dogged determination created from tiny beginnings a vast, highly respected business"; his work with the North Wales Industrial Association led to its amalgamation with the South Wales and Monmouthshire Industries Association in 1947. His decision to move several of his own businesses to Wales created 500 jobs.
