= John Lewis Owen =

John Lewis Owen was the member of the Parliament of England for the constituency of Merioneth in 1572.
