= Ysaiah Ross =

- Education: University of California, Berkeley
- Occupations: lawyer, academic and writer

Ysaiah 'Stan' Ross is an American lawyer, academic and writer.

Ross was educated in New York and California, gaining a law degree from the University of California, Berkeley, in 1964. Before teaching law and legal ethics at the University of New South Wales, he lectured at Auckland University and Makerere University, Uganda.

He was one of the founders of the Berkeley Neighborhood Legal Service in 1967 and, in 1968, was appointed its acting director. He has been a consultant to the Law Reform Commission of New South Wales and Papua New Guinea.

He co-authored 16 books, mostly on legal ethics. He wrote columns for the Australian Financial Review from 1999 to 2003; the Australian Lawyer from 1996 to 1997 and The Australian from 2004 to 2008.

Ross retired in 1999, but has continued to teach part time and to give legal ethics advice as a barrister.

== Bibliography ==
- Ethics in law : lawyers' responsibility and accountability in Australia
- Politics of Law Reform, Penguin Books, Melbourne, 1982 ISBN 0-14-022325-8
- The Jokes on ... Lawyers ISBN 1-86287-240-6
