= Matthew Herbert (died 1611) =

Member of the Parliament of England

Matthew Herbert (c. 1563 – 1611), of Dolguog, Machynlleth, Montgomeryshire, was a Welsh politician.

He was a member (MP) of the parliament of England for Montgomery Boroughs in 1586. He was a justice of the peace for Montgomeryshire from c. 1594 and Merionethshire from c. 1596. He was Sheriff of Merionethshire in 1598–99 and again in 1609–10.
