= Stanley Shanfield =

- Known for: Semiconductor device fabrication and optical electronics
- Scientific career
- Fields: Physics
- Workplaces: Charles Stark Draper Laboratory

Stanley Shanfield serves as a Distinguished Member of the Technical Staff and Technical Director of Advanced Hardware Development at the Charles Stark Draper Laboratory in Cambridge, Massachusetts, a post he has held since 2003. He is the holder of seven patents and has led teams responsible for inventing and manufacturing new technologies in the fields of semiconductor device fabrication and optical electronics.

== Professional Biography ==
Following his graduation from the University of California, Irvine, where he received a B.S. in Physics in 1977, Stanley Shanfield went on to complete a Doctoral degree from the Massachusetts Institute of Technology (PhD, 1981).

As a newly graduated physicist he became a staff scientist and later senior scientist with Spire Corporation of Bedford, Massachusetts, a manufacturer of renewable energy photovoltaics (1981–1984). In 1985 he joined Raytheon Corporation, serving for seven years as Section Manager for Semiconductors. His work there focused primarily on designs for integrated circuits. In 1992 he was promoted to Laboratory Manager, overseeing the invention of a pseudomorphic high electron mobility transistor. In 1996 he became Manager, Semiconductor Operations, a post he held for three years before a two-year stint as Vice President of Operations at AXSUN Technologies of Bedford, Massachusetts. There he oversaw the development and production of the company's micro-electromechanical (MEM) Fabry-Perot optical filter. As a result of this work Dr. Shanfield was awarded patents for semiconductor processing and control electronics. In 2001 he joined Clarendon Photonics (Newton, Massachusetts) as Director, Packaging & Integration, a post he held until 2003. There he invented a new semiconductor technology for optical add-drop multiplexers. His research at Draper Labs, where he began work in 2003, has resulted in the invention of an ultra-miniature electronics fabrication technology, a newly designed precision MEMS-based gyroscope and associated ASIC (application-specific integrated circuit), the development of a miniaturized power source, and the technology and manufacturing process for a semiconductor-based low phase noise oscillator. He currently consults throughout the world as an expert in these matters through Rubin/Anders Scientific, Inc.

== Awards and honors ==
Dr. Shanfield's undergraduate and graduate school careers were marked by several distinctions. Besides attending college on full scholarship, graduating Cum Laude and being elected to Phi Beta Kappa, he won the prestigious U.C. Regents Award for outstanding research project (1975).

== Publications ==
- Shanfield, S. (1984). "Process Characterization of PSG and BPSG Plasma Deposition". Journal of the Electrochemical Society. 131 (9). The Electrochemical Society: 2202–2203. Bibcode:1984JElS..131.2202S. doi:10.1149/1.2116051. ISSN 0013-4651.
- Huang, J.C.; Saledas, P.; Wendler, J.; Platzker, A.; Boulais, W.; et al. (1993). "A double-recessed Al_{0.24}GaAs/In_{0.16}GaAs pseudomorphic HEMT for Ka- and Q-band power applications". IEEE Electron Device Letters. 14 (9): 456–458. doi:10.1109/55.244708. ISSN 0741-3106. S2CID 2409744.
- Shanfield, S. (1989). "Formation of Thick Metal Structures on GaAs MMICs Using Image Reversal Lithography and Evaporated Metal Deposition". Journal of the Electrochemical Society. 136 (9). The Electrochemical Society: 2687–2690. Bibcode:1989JElS..136.2687S. doi:10.1149/1.2097552. ISSN 0013-4651.
- Contact Hole Etching in Load-Locked Hexagonal Reactive Ion Etch System J. Electrochem. Soc., Vol. 131, No. 8, 1984
- Huang, J.C.; Jackson, G.S.; Shanfield, S.; Platzker, A.; Saledas, P.K.; Weichert, C. (1993). "An AlGaAs/InGaAs pseudomorphic high electron mobility transistor with improved breakdown voltage for X- and Ku-band power applications". IEEE Transactions on Microwave Theory and Techniques. 41 (5): 752–759. Bibcode:1993ITMTT..41..752H. doi:10.1109/22.234507. ISSN 0018-9480.
- Hot-electron-induced Degradation of Metal-Semiconductor Field-Effect Transistors GaAs Integrated Circuit Symposium, 1994. Technical Digest 1994., 16th Annual Volume, Issue, 16–19 October 1994, pp. 259–262
- Shanfield, S.; Wolfson, R. (1983). "Ion beam synthesis of cubic boron nitride". Journal of Vacuum Science & Technology A: Vacuum, Surfaces, and Films. 1 (2). American Vacuum Society: 323–325. Bibcode:1983JVSTA...1..323S. doi:10.1116/1.572124. ISSN 0734-2101.

== Patents ==
US Patent 5223458 - Passivation layer and process for semiconductor devices Method of coating semiconductor devices that prevented parametric shift in electrical performance. Solved key processing problem.

US Patent 4440108 - Ion Beam Deposition Apparatus Design of equipment for deposition of thin films in the presence of ion bombardment. System produced thin films of interest for mechanical, electrical and optical properties and was sold as an equipment product.

US Patent 6525880 - Integrated Tunable Fabry-Perot filter and Method of Making Same Design and method for fabricating very small, very high performance variable optical filter using semiconductor fabrication technology. In current use in fiber optical networks, chemical sensors, and 3-D medical imaging applications.

US Patent 4440108 - Boron Nitride Films and Process of Making Same Ion assisted deposition of ultra-hard cubic boron nitride films for semiconductor and machine tool applications. Significant use in both areas.

US Patent 4526673 - Coating Method Method for deposition of thin films used in semiconductor device fabrication. Method based on direct control of the kinetics of thin film deposition.

US Patent Application 2007/00254411 - Systems and Methods for High Density Multi-Component Modules Method for fabrication of electronic modules using multiple thinned integrated circuits, patterned multi-level interconnects, passive electronic components, and sensors

US Patent Application 2009/TBD - Devices, systems, and methods for controlling the temperature of resonant elements Devices and systems for achieving low phase noise crystal oscillators using unique low power thermoelectric structures
