= Stanley Ross =

Stanley Ross was a moniker used by American indie songwriter Nicholas Meiers based in Chicago. Meiers is also the owner/operator of Nodak Records, a split seven-inch vinyl label based in Chicago. Meiers began performing as Stanley Ross, solo or with a band, in 2004. He has performed in numerous bands over the years, including Lardo, Soft Jolts, Devin Davis, Love Story in Blood Red, The Last Cannibals, Harbor Lights, and Barbeau. In 2011, Meiers appeared vocally on the debut album of Chicago-based band Phantom Works. Nicholas Meiers is also the grandson of former North Dakota Lt. Governor Ruth Meiers.

== Discography ==
=== Studio albums ===
- 2009: Here With Me (out of print)
- 2008: Favorites (out of print)

=== EPs ===
- 2010: MN-EP (recorded with Gary Burger of The Monks, distributed at RockProper.com)
- 2006: Nelsonain (produced by American indie musician Devin Davis)

=== Compilation appearances ===
- 2006: "Shrug it Off" on Justice Music Project compilation CD

=== Singles ===
- 2009: "Chin Music" online only via iTunes
- 2004: "Sycamore Song" on Nodak Records (split 7-inch with Love Story in Blood Red)
