= Charles Stanley (disambiguation) =

Charles Stanley (1932–2023) was an American preacher, pastor of First Baptist Church, Atlanta, Georgia.

Charles Stanley may also refer to:

- Simon Carl Stanley (1703–1761), Danish sculptor known in England as Charles Stanley
- Charles Stanley, 8th Earl of Derby (1628–1672), Lord of Mann 1660–1672
- Charles Stanley (priest) (1884–?), Irish Anglican dean of Lismore
- Charles Stanley (Wisconsin politician) (1849–1908), Wisconsin state legislator
- John Stanley (composer) (Charles John Stanley, 1712–1786), English composer
- Charles H. Stanley (1842–1913), comptroller of Maryland
- Charles Henry Stanley (1819–1901), American chess player
- Charles Orr Stanley (1899–1989), Irish businessman, head of British company Pye Ltd
- Charles Zedenno Stanley (1666–1715), English MP and governor of the Isle of Man
- Charlie Stanley, former drummer of English indie rock band The Ordinary Boys
- Chuck Stanley, pen name of American writer Charles S. Strong

== See also ==
- Charles Stanley Group, a British investment management firm
