= Stan Thomas =

Stan Thomas may refer to:

- Stan Thomas (Australian footballer) (1892–1958), Australian rules footballer
- Stan Thomas (coach) (1893–1974), Australian rules football coach and administrator
- Stan Thomas (baseball) (born 1949), former baseball pitcher
- Stan Thomas (American football) (born 1968), former American football player
- Stan Thomas (association footballer) (1919–c. 1985), inside forward for Tranmere Rovers

== See also ==
- Stanley Thomas, British businessman and property developer
