= Stanley Sorenson =

- First appearance: Fablehaven
- Created by: Brandon Mull

In-universe information
- Nickname: Stan
- Species: Human
- Gender: Male
- Occupation: Caretaker
- Family: Kendra Sorenson (granddaughter), Seth Sorenson (grandson), Marla Larsen (daughter-in-law)
- Spouse: Ruth Sorenson
- Children: Scott Sorenson
- Relatives: Dale and Warren Burgess, Patton Burgess

Stanley Sorenson, also known as Grandpa Sorenson, is a main character in Brandon Mull's fantasy series Fablehaven.

== In the books ==
=== Fablehaven ===
Grandpa Sorenson is Kendra and Seth's grandfather on their father's side. He is the caretaker of Fablehaven. Grandpa leaves clues about the true nature of the preserve, in hopes that Kendra and Seth will discover the truth that it is a preserve for magical creatures. The kids do figure it out, but soon afterward Seth, in a moment of bad judgment, makes it possible for unsavory creatures to enter the house, and Grandpa and Lena are kidnapped. They are held hostage by the witch, Muriel, at the Forgotten Chapel where she is endeavoring to free a demon named Bahumat. Grandpa is married to Grandma Sorenson who spends much of the first book in the form of a chicken.

=== Fablehaven: Rise of the Evening Star ===
In the second book, over the Summer, Grandpa has Vanessa Santoro, Coulter Dixon, and Tanu Dufu train and teach Kendra and Seth for future adventuring. The Society of the Evening Star, an ancient organization determined to overthrow magical preserves and use them for their own intents and purposes, is determined to infiltrate Fablehaven. Grandpa invites the three specialists to help protect the property: a potion master, a magical relics collector, and a mystical creature trapper. In addition, these three specialists have a more perilous assignment, which is to find an artifact of great power hidden on the grounds. Vanessa is then revealed as a traitor and a member of the Society. She takes over the house along with Christopher Vogel, who posed as Errol Fisk.

=== Fablehaven: Grip of the Shadow Plague ===
In the third book, Grandpa gets turned into a shadow after he decides to go after the artifact.

=== Fablehaven: Secrets of the Dragon Sanctuary ===
In Secrets of the Dragon Sanctuary, Grandpa Sorenson comes out of retirement to become the new captain for the Knights of the Dawn.

=== Fablehaven: Keys to the Demon Prison ===
In the fifth book, Grandpa takes part in the failed rescue mission and is imprisoned at Living Mirage for most of the book.
