= James Stanley =

James or Jim Stanley may refer to:

- James Stanley, 7th Earl of Derby (1607–1651), Lord of Mann and Earl of Derby
- James Stanley, 10th Earl of Derby (1664–1736), British peer and politician
- James Stanley (American football) (born 1978), American football player and coach
- James Stanley (bishop) (c. 1465–1515), Bishop of Ely 1506–1515
- James Stanley (writer), American soap opera actor, writer and producer
- James Lee Stanley (born 1946), American folk singer-songwriter
- James Smith-Stanley, Lord Strange (1716–1771), Chancellor of the Duchy of Lancaster
- Jim Stanley (American football) (1935–2012), American football player and coach
- Jim Stanley (baseball) (1888–1947), baseball shortstop
