= Stanley Wagner =

Stanley Wagner may refer to:

- Stanley Wagner (ice hockey) (1908–2002)
- Stanley Wagner (winemaker) (1927–2010)
- Stanley M. Wagner (1932–2013), American rabbi and academic
