= Stan Ross (lacrosse) =

American lacrosse coach

Stan Ross is the head lacrosse coach at Oxbridge Academy in West Palm Beach Florida. Ross was the head coach of the Florida Launch of Major League Lacrosse. Ross played defense at Boys Latin and at Loyola of Maryland in the late 1980s and early 1990s.
