= Llanfachreth =

Village in Gwynedd, Wales

Coordinates: 52.785°N 3.848°W

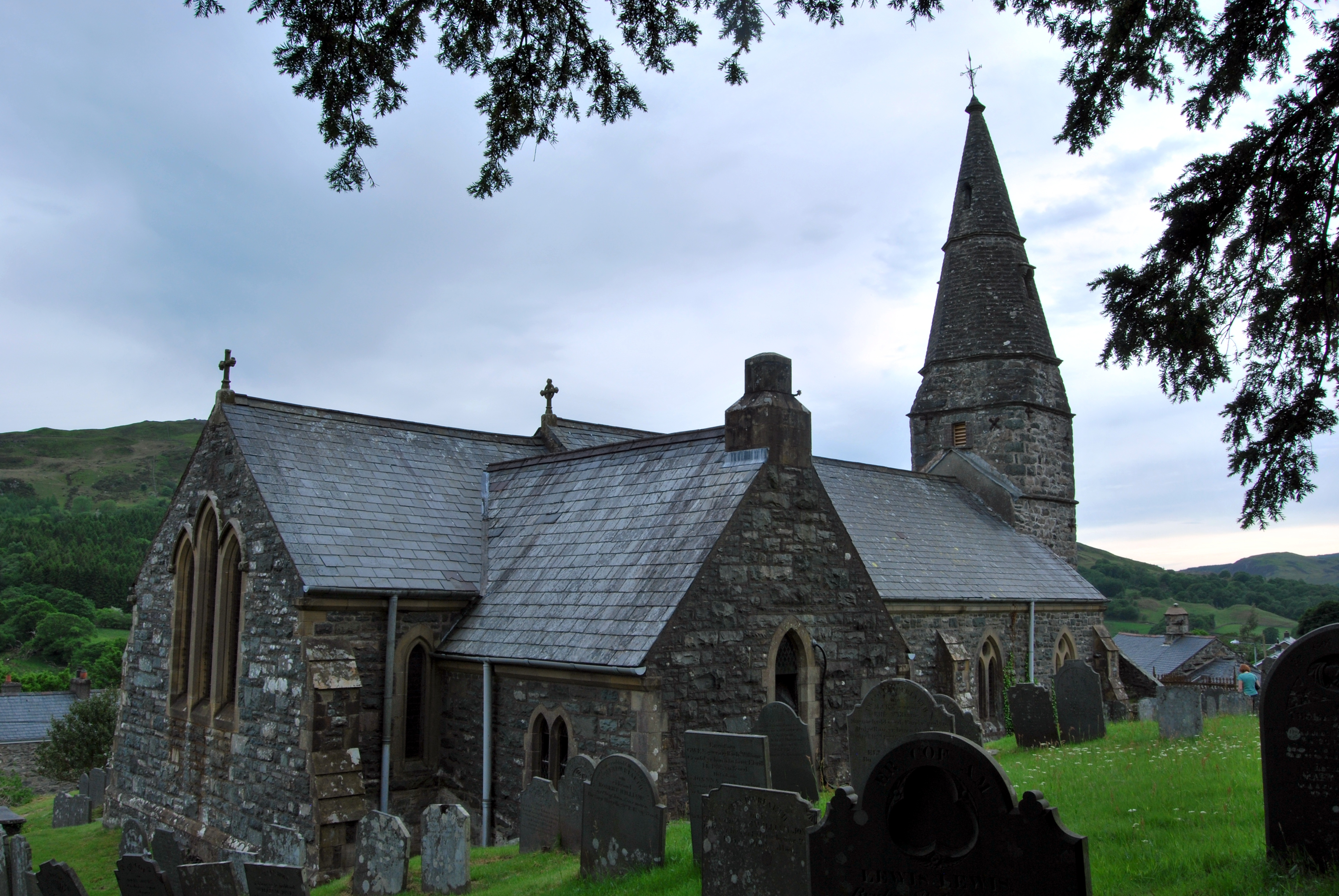
- St. Machreth Church, Llanfachreth

- Location within Gwynedd
- Population: 200 (2001 census)
- OS grid reference: SH755225
- Community: Brithdir and Llanfachreth
- Principal area: Gwynedd
- Preserved county: Gwynedd
- Country: Wales
- Sovereign state: United Kingdom
- Post town: DOLGELLAU
- Postcode district: LL40
- Dialling code: 01341
- Police: North Wales
- Fire: North Wales
- Ambulance: Welsh
- UK Parliament: Dwyfor Meirionnydd
- Senedd Cymru – Welsh Parliament: Dwyfor Meirionnydd

Llanfachreth is a village approximately three miles north-east of Dolgellau, Gwynedd, in the community of Brithdir and Llanfachreth within the historic boundaries of Merionethshire (Welsh: Meirionnydd, Sir Feirionnydd), Wales.

== History ==
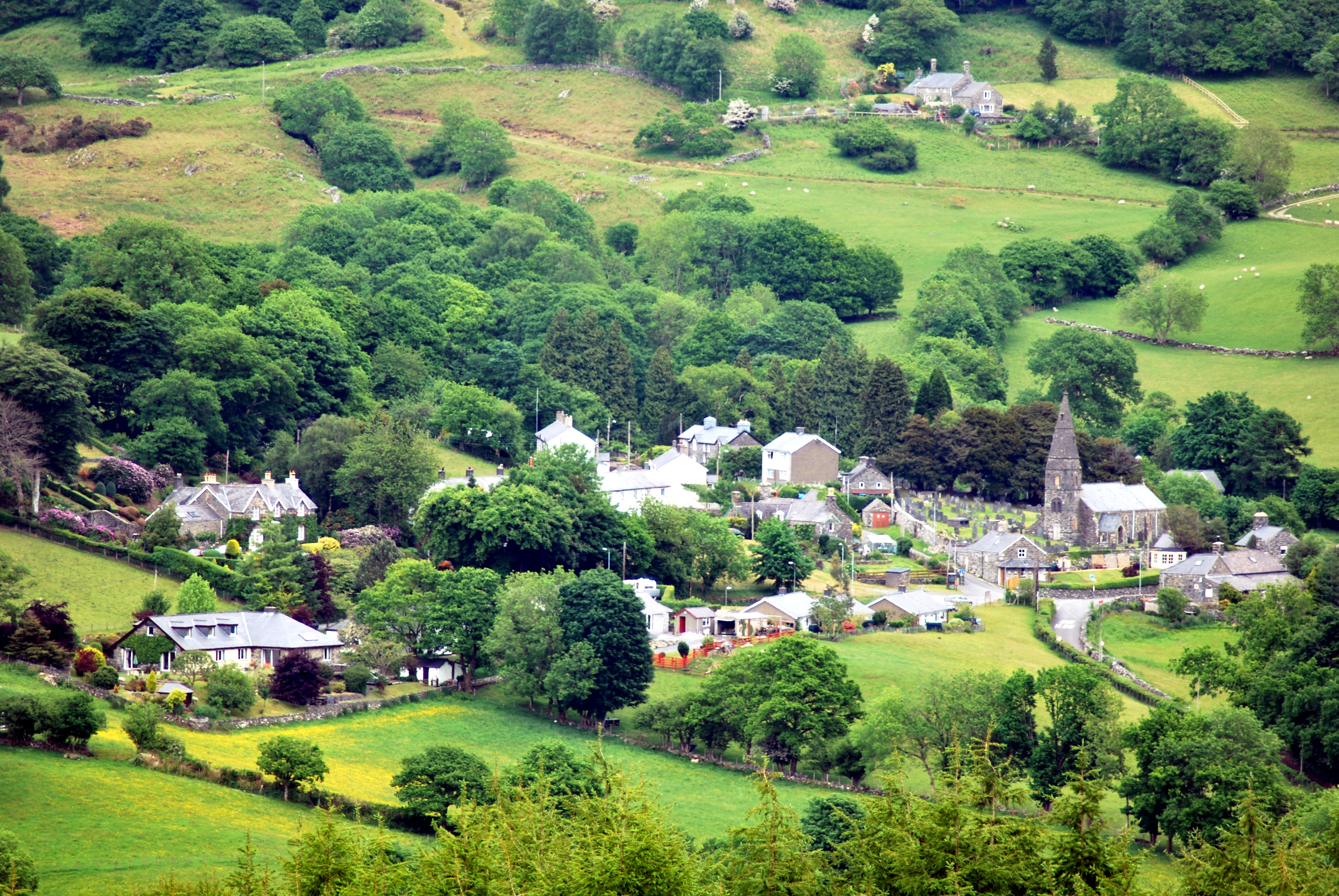
Llanfachreth from the Precipice Walk

Llanfachreth is a small village near Dolgellau in north-west Wales; it was greatly influenced by the local Nannau family. The village is mentioned in the Imperial Gazetteer of England and Wales by John Marius Wilson in 1872 :

"LLANFACHRETH, a village and a parish in Dolgelly district, Merioneth. The village stands on the river Mawddach, at the N foot of Moel-Orthrwm, 3¼ miles NNE of Dolgelly r. station; and has a post office under Corwen, and fairs on 22 April, 30 June, 15 Aug., and 23 Oct. The parish comprises the townships of Nannau-Isafon and Nannau-Uwchafon. ..."

The parish emerged from the ancient commote of Talybont, Meirionnydd. It is in the Mid and West Wales region, and is on a tributary of the Afon Mawddach. The village is in the valley of the Mawddach and at the foot of Foel Offrwm and Rhobell Fawr. To the south-west on another prominent hill, the Foel Cynwch, is the famous Precipice Walk. The parish is now part of the Diocese of Bangor. The town is mentioned in the Royal Commission on the Ancient and Historical Monuments of Wales as part of the 6th edition, county of Merioneth.

=== Ancient history ===
The village and surrounding area have thousands of years of history; this includes the tumulus 'Cors y Garnardd', near the farm it is named after. There are the remnants of a hillfort on Moel offrwm (translated 'Hill of sacrifice'), which is mentioned in the Peniarth Manuscripts where a local Lord named Ophrom Gawr once lived, and 'Y Gaer', a camp situated 1000 ft. above sea. In older history an Iron Age fort was discovered, named 'Dol y Clochydd' (the sexton's meadow). In addition Bronze Age urns have been found in a bronze age cyst.

== The village ==
Interesting features other than the church and its Lych Gate include a war memorial to local residents who gave their lives in the world wars, and also a mounting block that once stood at the bottom of the steps to the Lych gate once served as a "town cryer" type of meeting place. The cottage "Ty-isa", opposite the church steps, was previously a pub and brewery. In later temperate times the brewing cauldron was used elsewhere to dip sheep.

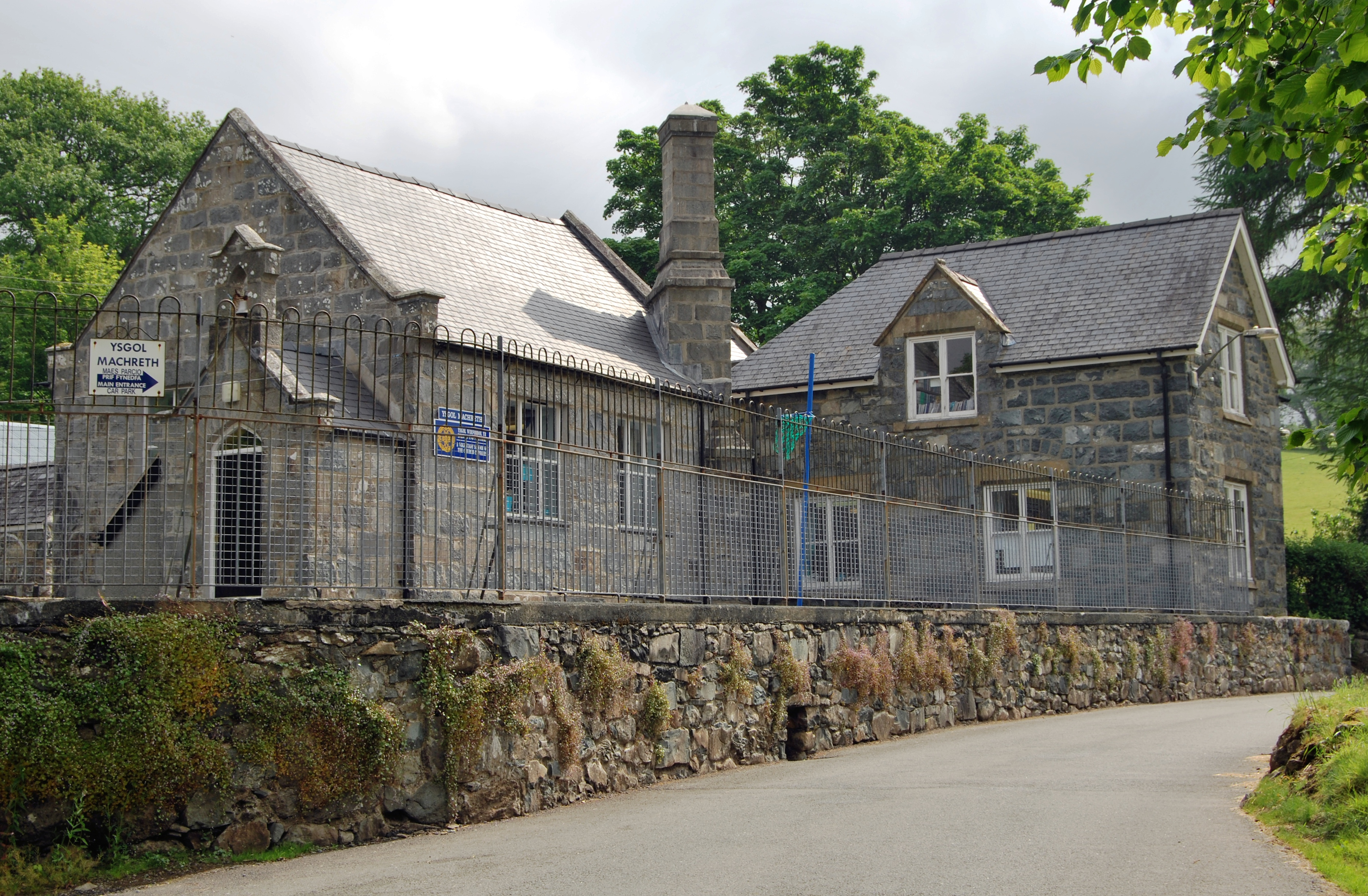
Llanfachreth School

Prior to the mid 19th century education for the children of the large parish was haphazard and undertaken by parents, the church or by volunteers and the standard was very low throughout Wales.

=== Nannau family influence ===
From the 12th century two families, the Nanneys and the Vaughans, controlled the area that formed the greater part of the parish of Llanfachreth. The estate was, and is, known as the Nannau estate. The history of Llanfachreth is inextricably intertwined with the fortunes of these families. Cadwgan, son of Bleddyn ap Cynfyn, Prince of Powys in the early 12th century, came into possession of large areas in Merioneth and built Nannau house, a mansion a mile south west of Llanfachreth, which Obert Vaughan of Hengwrt (1592?-1667) later called the stateliest structure in North Wales. Cadwgan founded a small colony of serfs at Llanfachreth, his free followers settled the lands surrounding the house. The settlements spread over the area of Llanfachreth and became arable holdings made up of 70 tyddynod. Cadwgan was killed at Welshpool in 1111 but his lands remained in his family until 1701.

Robert Williams Vaughan, 1768 to 1843, the second baronet, ruled the surrounding countryside with benevolent autocracy for over 50 years. He was affectionately known as "Yr Hen Syr Robert" and, during this golden age of the estate, he rebuilt Nannau between 1788 and 1796, was elected as MP for Merioneth in 1792, and subsequently re-elected thirteen times, sitting till 1836. He accomplished much for the area; along with the rebuilding of nearby Dolgellau he financed much renewal of cottages, enclosure walls, houses, roads, fencing and created the precipice walk on the estate. Much of this work was paid for by Robert to relieve unemployment after the Napoleonic Wars. He built several roads from Nannau house and, a mile east of Llanfachreth across the Bontnewydd road, a striking arch called "Y Garreg Fawr" (the Great Stone) because of huge stone, brought from Harlech, that forms the span. Many of the cottages he had rebuilt in Llanfachreth are unusual architecturally. They include slate roofs curving over dormer windows, for instance, and porches with rounded brick pillars. The last he built was "Glasgoed" a mile north of Llanfachreth. In 1814, Vaughan bought the township of cottages Nannau Is Afon in Llanfachreth, the land was occupied by squatters.

== Church ==
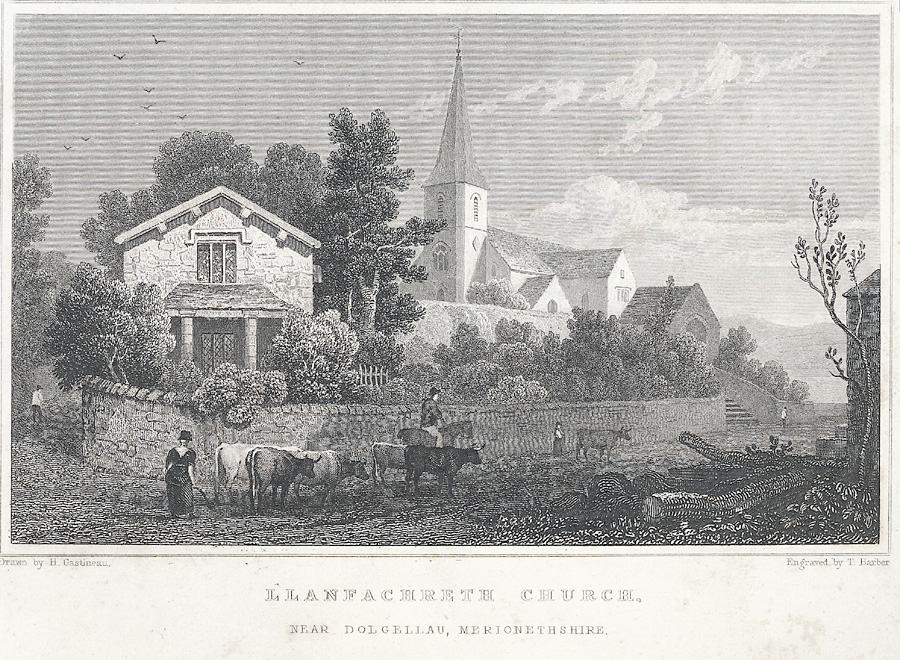
Llanfachreth Church, by Barber, Thomas, fl. 1818–1846, engraver.

St Machreth is thought to have come from Llanfacreth circa. 5th century. Locally there is a house near the village is called 'Gell Fachreth' (Machreth's Cell). The foundations of the church go back to the 15th century, when the 11th Lord of Nannau bequeathed 6 Shilling and 8 pence towards its construction in 1494. The church would remain the same for 300 years, until 2nd baronet Vaughan begins improvements that would take near three decades to complete, beginning in 1800.

The chancel inspriction reads :

"AD 1820, To the Memory of George III, King of Great Britain and Ireland. This structure (together with that of the South Side) intended to preserve the religion which he loved and practice, and to preserve which in its purity was the constant object of his endeavours, through a reign of unexampled length, were erected in the same year which deprived his people of their Father and Friend, by his dutiful and attached subject, Robert Williames Vaughan"

The core village has 80 inhabitants, and the surround farms to about 150, totalling 200 in the village, this makes a small congregation some of which would be Welsh speaking. The Regular members are fewer than a dozen, some of these coming in from other villages. Having no vicarage was very inconvenient especially since Llanelltyd came also under the care of the minister so, around 1844, a vicarage was petitioned and granted at a cost of around £400. The old Llanfachreth church was apparently higher and wider than present one though little is known. The choir sat high in a gallery across the chancel.

In 1872 the church built by the 2nd baronet in 1824 was demolished, with £1,000 (equivalent to £100,000 in 2025) donated by the owners of Nannau to build a church which took 1 year to complete. The Bishop of Bangor, James Colquhoun Campbell gave the sermon, the day was to coincide with 30 years after the death of Vaughan, the 2nd baronet. The tower still stands from the original 19th century rebuild. The church memorials are for Nanneys and Vaughans of Nannau and also the Morgan family of Hengwrt; there is also a memorial to Rice Jones, a Welsh poet. The churchyard has four ancient yews.

=== Chapel ===
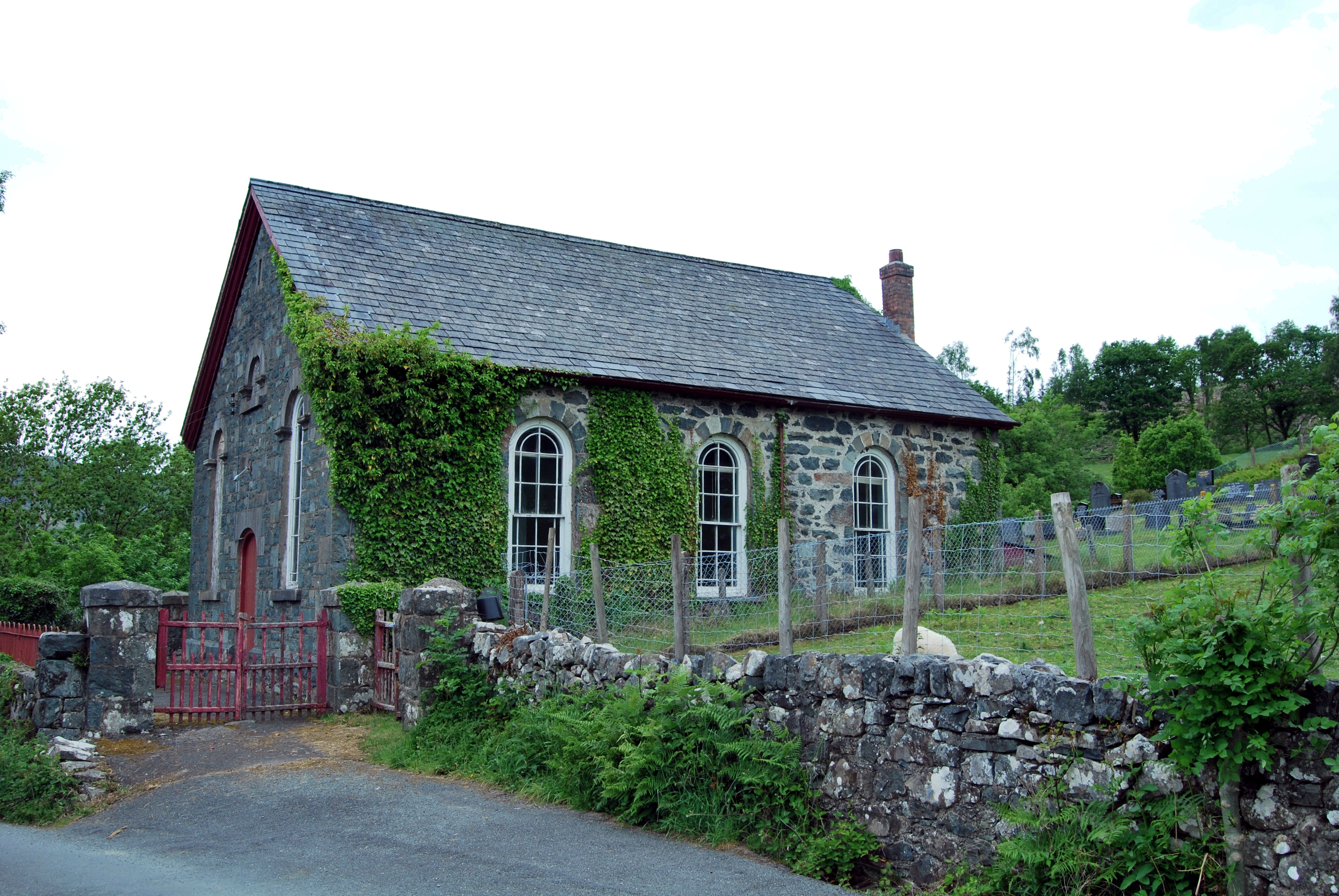
Llanfachreth Methodist Chapel

There were protestations by the local baronet about Methodism and the church, Methodists were not allowed to rent his property but found homes not owned by him to rent. in 1804 a new chapel was built to accommodate for another congregation.

== Local attractions ==
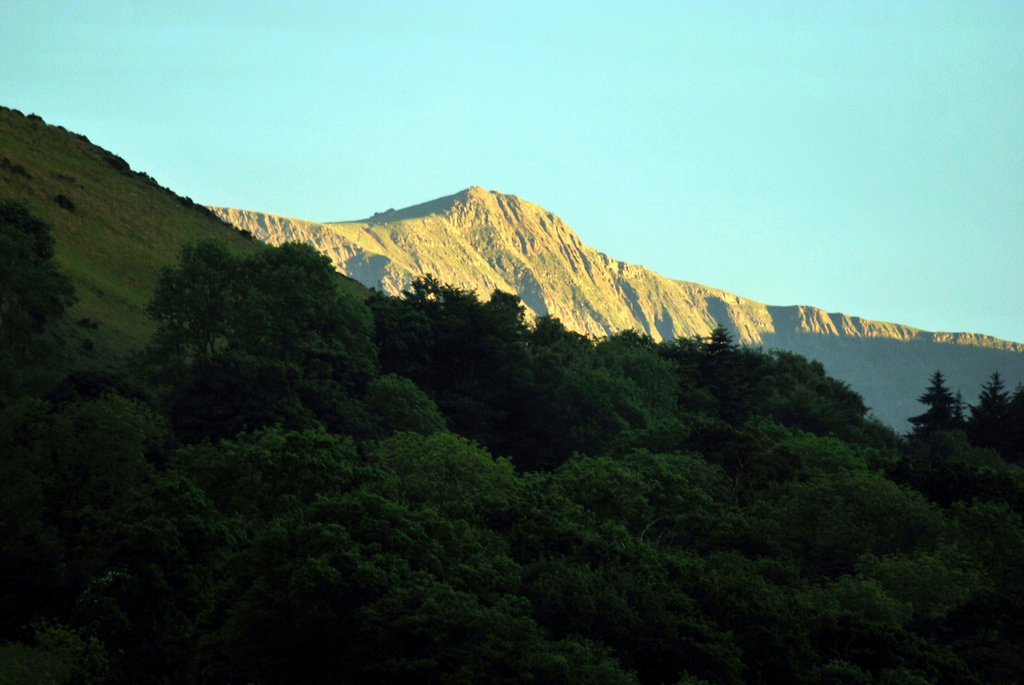
Cader Idris glimpsed from Heulwen

The surrounding area is known for its wild but beautiful countryside and places of historical interest. It is popular with tourists who enjoy activities such as walking, hiking, horse riding, white-water rafting and climbing. Nearby Dolgellau is a base for climbers of Cadair Idris (known as Cader Idris locally).

There also the Great Western Railway line from Ruabon to Llangollen was extended via Corwen and Llanuwchllyn to Dolgellau, where it formed an end-on connection with the Cambrian Railways line from Barmouth Junction and a shared station was opened there in 1868. The Ruabon Barmouth line was closed in the 1960s under the Beeching Axe. The railway line was converted some years ago into the Llwybr Mawddach (or "Mawddach Trail") which now runs for some eight miles from Dolgellau to Morfa Mawddach railway station, near Fairbourne on the coast. It is maintained by the Snowdonia National Park and is very popular with walkers and cyclists. It passes some estuarine areas that are important for water birds.

Historical attractions also include the 12th century Cymer Abbey. Also a mile to the West of Llanfachreth, along the banks of the Mawddach, are nature walks and disused copper mines to explore.

Llanfachreth is a good centre for visiting a number of nearby narrow-gauge heritage railways, including the Corris Railway, the Fairbourne Railway and the Talyllyn Railway. The Center for Alternative Technology is some 20 miles to the south.

The village lies in the hills near the centre of Snowdonia National Park, close to the Precipice Walk, the Mawddach valley and footpaths across the surrounding hills. Cader Idris is visible from the area in clear weather and is a short drive away.

== Famous residents ==
- Rice Jones, 1713–1801, Welsh Bard and historian of great repute. He was the son of John Jones of Blaenau, Llanfachreth and educated first at nearby Dolgellau then Shrewsbury. His works were published in 1818 under the title Gwaith Prydyddawl Y Diweddar Rice Jones o'r Blaenau, Meirion. Gan Rice Jones Owen, Wyr yr Awdur . He died 14 February 1801 and was buried in St. Machreth church.
- William Williams of Wern (1781–1840) an Independent minister in Wales
- E. Gwyndaf Evans (1913–1986) a poet who served as Archdruid of the National Eisteddfod of Wales from 1966 to 1969.

== Gallery ==
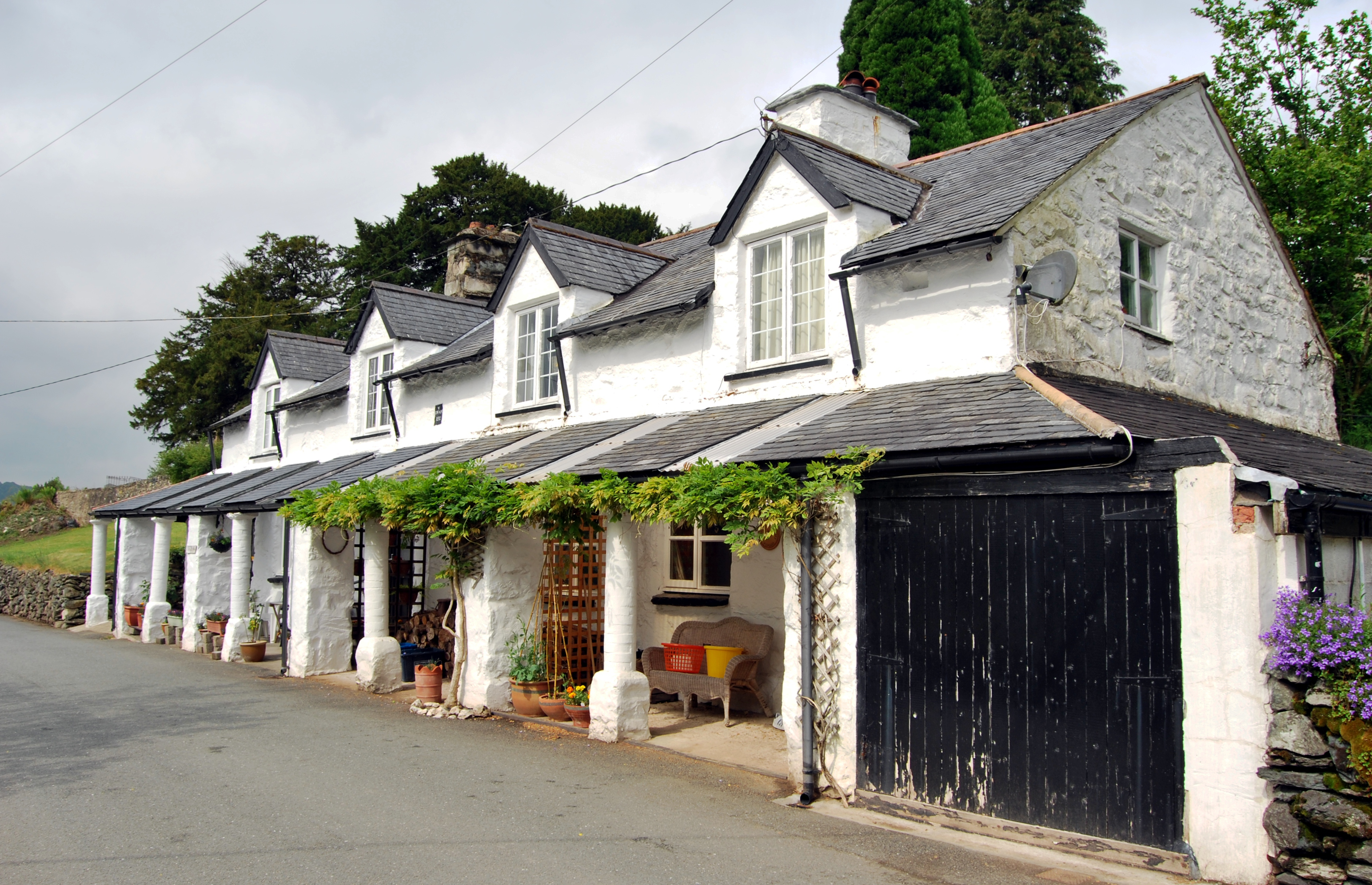
Llanfachreth Vaughnan Cottages

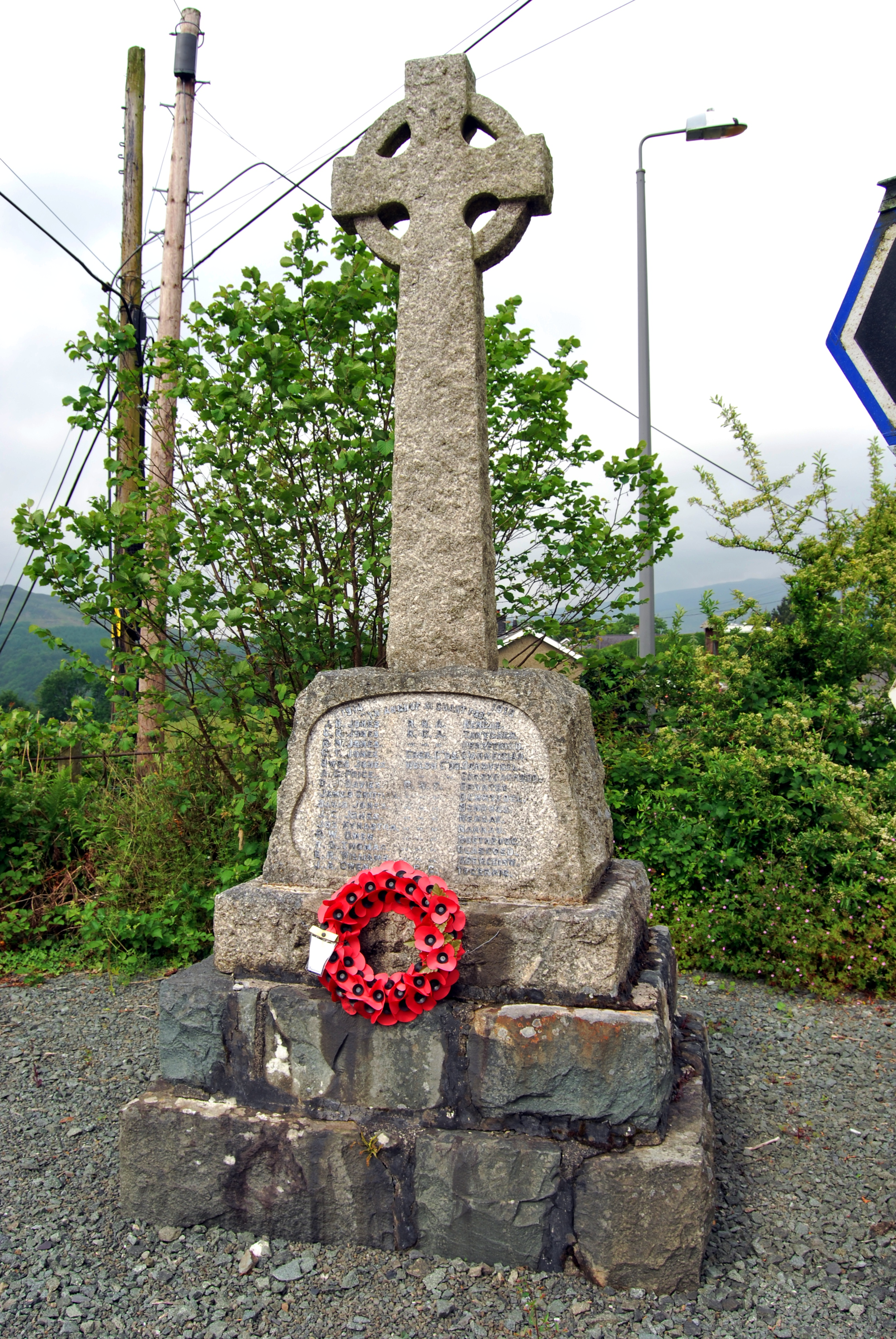
Llanfachreth War Memorial

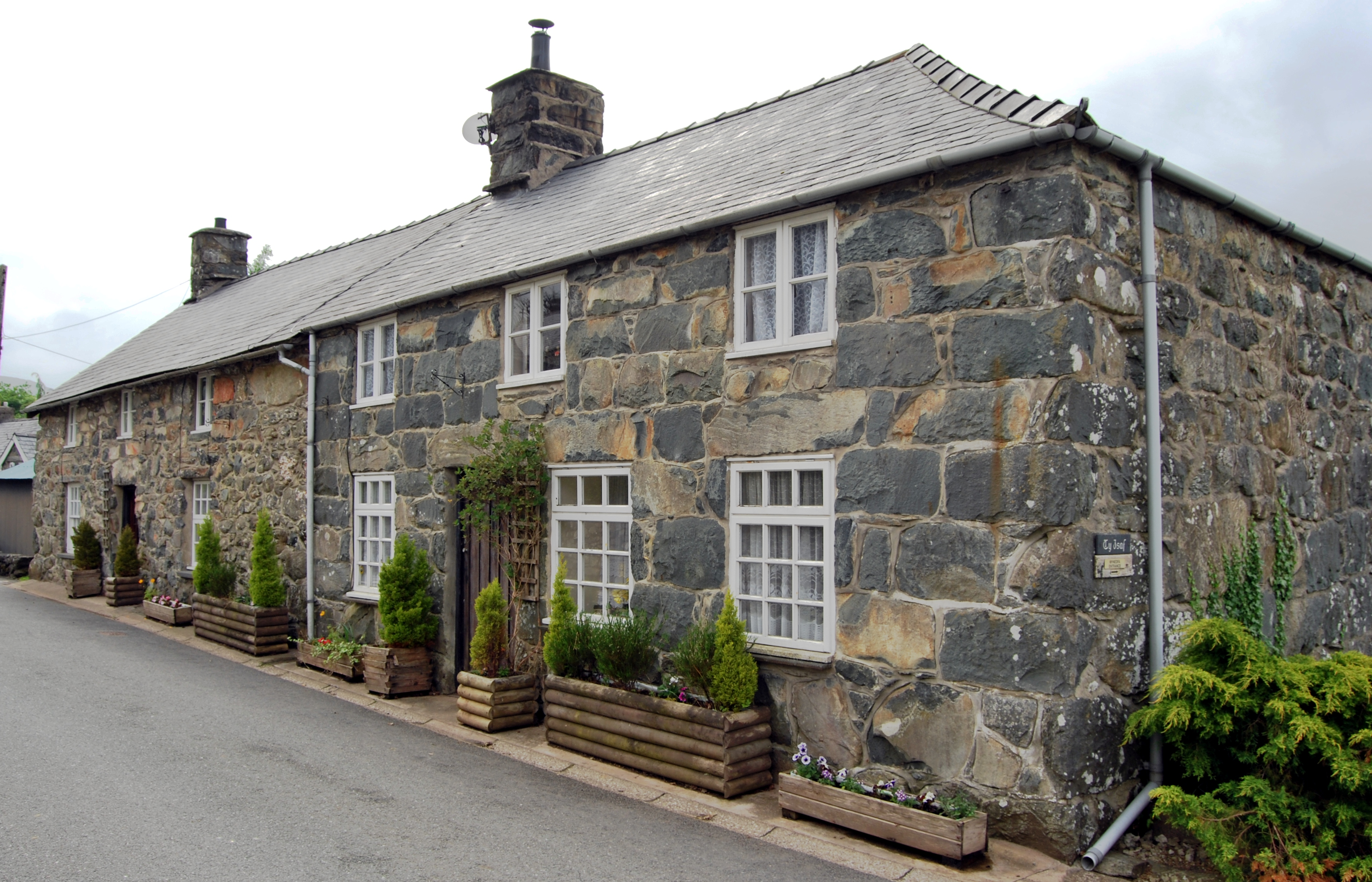
Llanfachreth Cottages south of Church

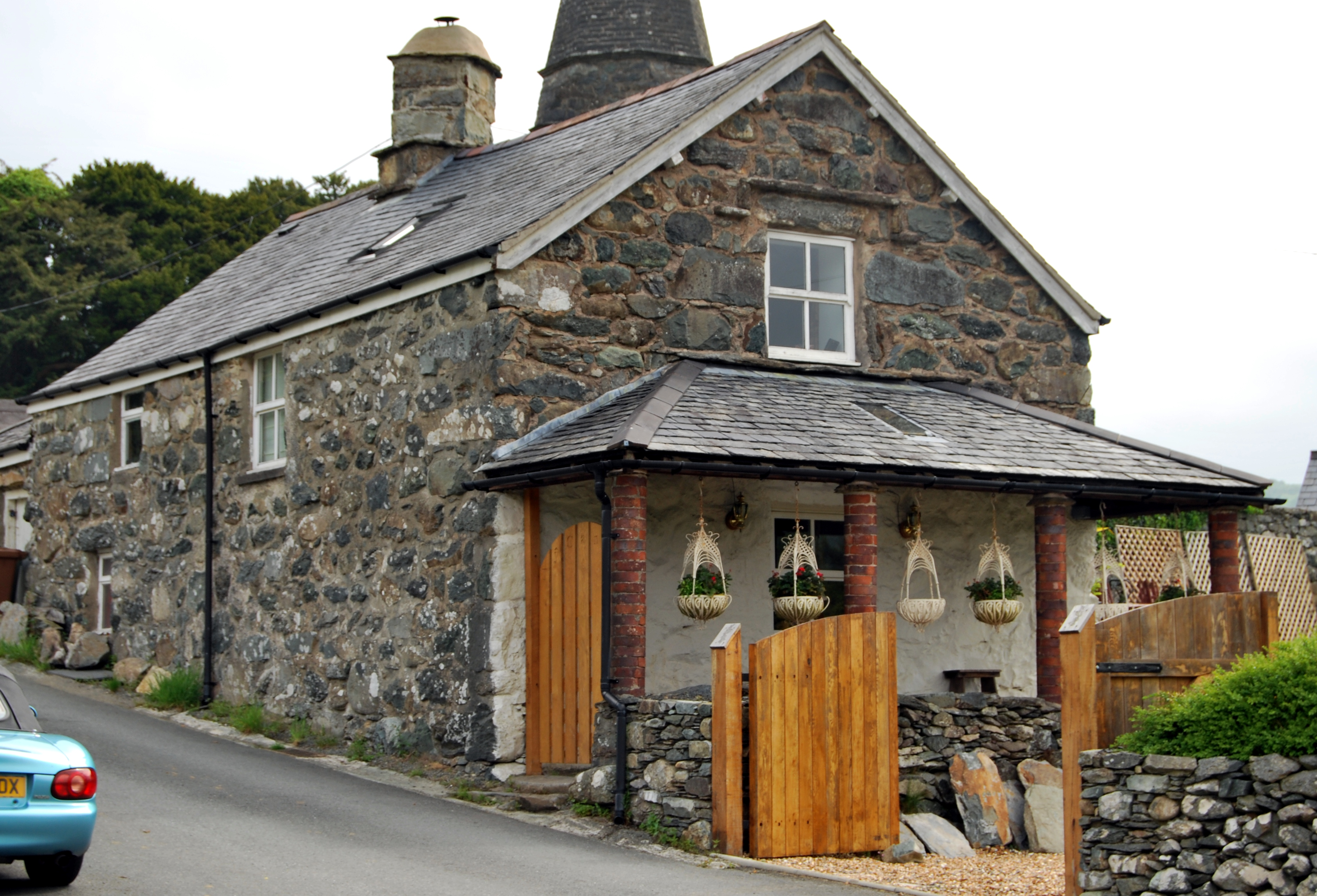
Cottage near church with circular pillars and verandah

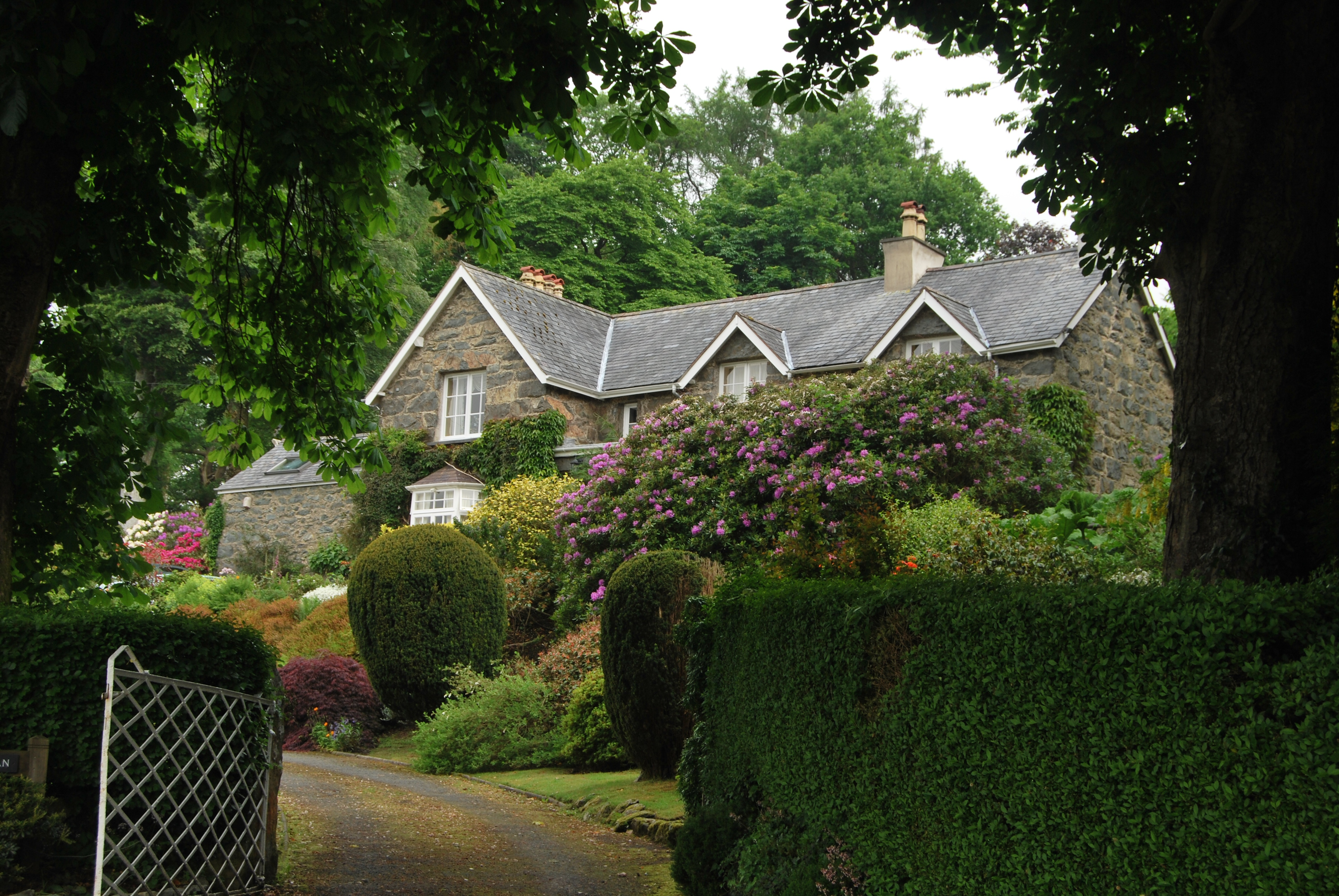
Llanfachreth Old Vicarage

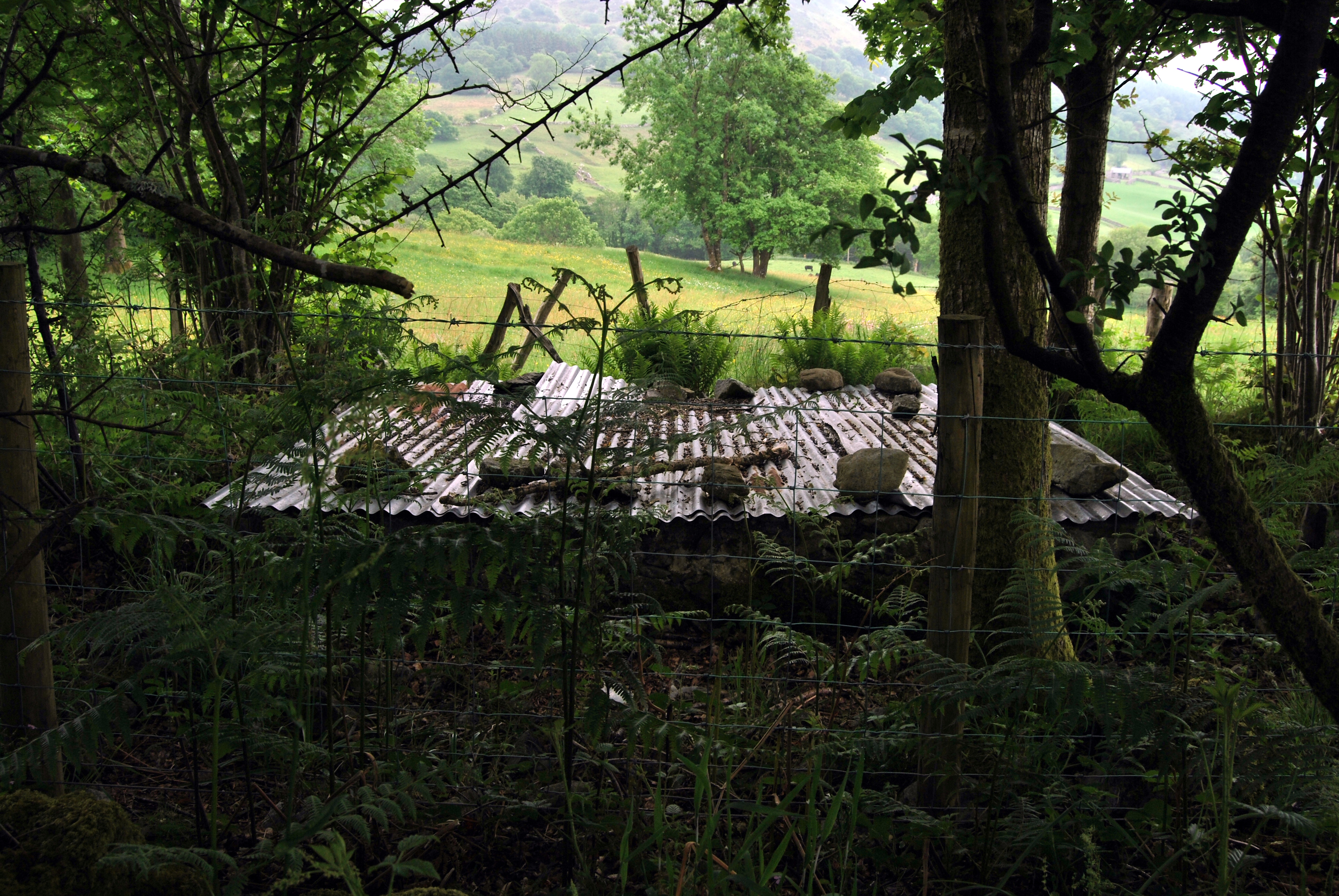
Llanfachreth site of Baptist Well

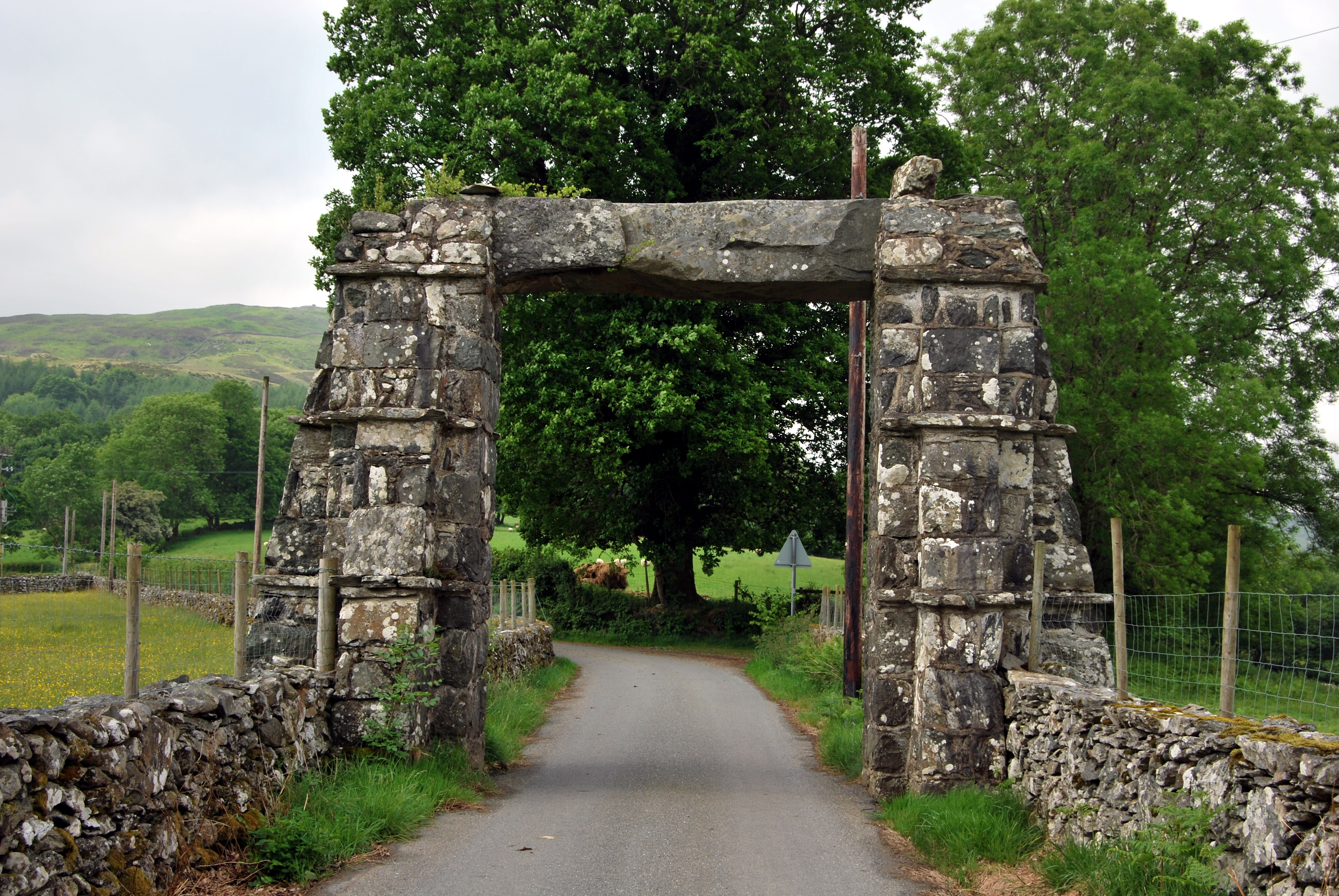
Y Garreg Fawr, Arch entrance to Nannau Estate

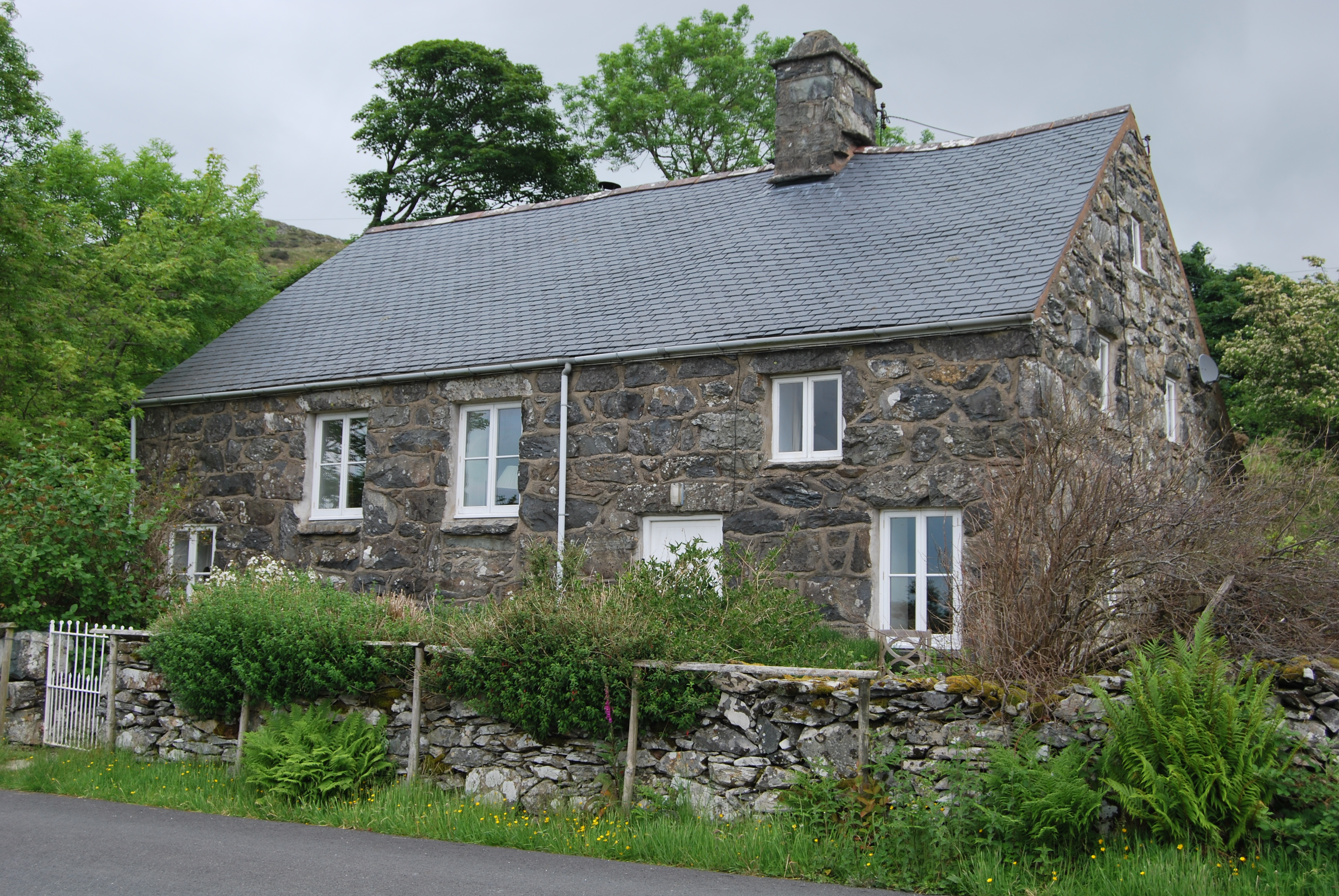
Capel Carmel

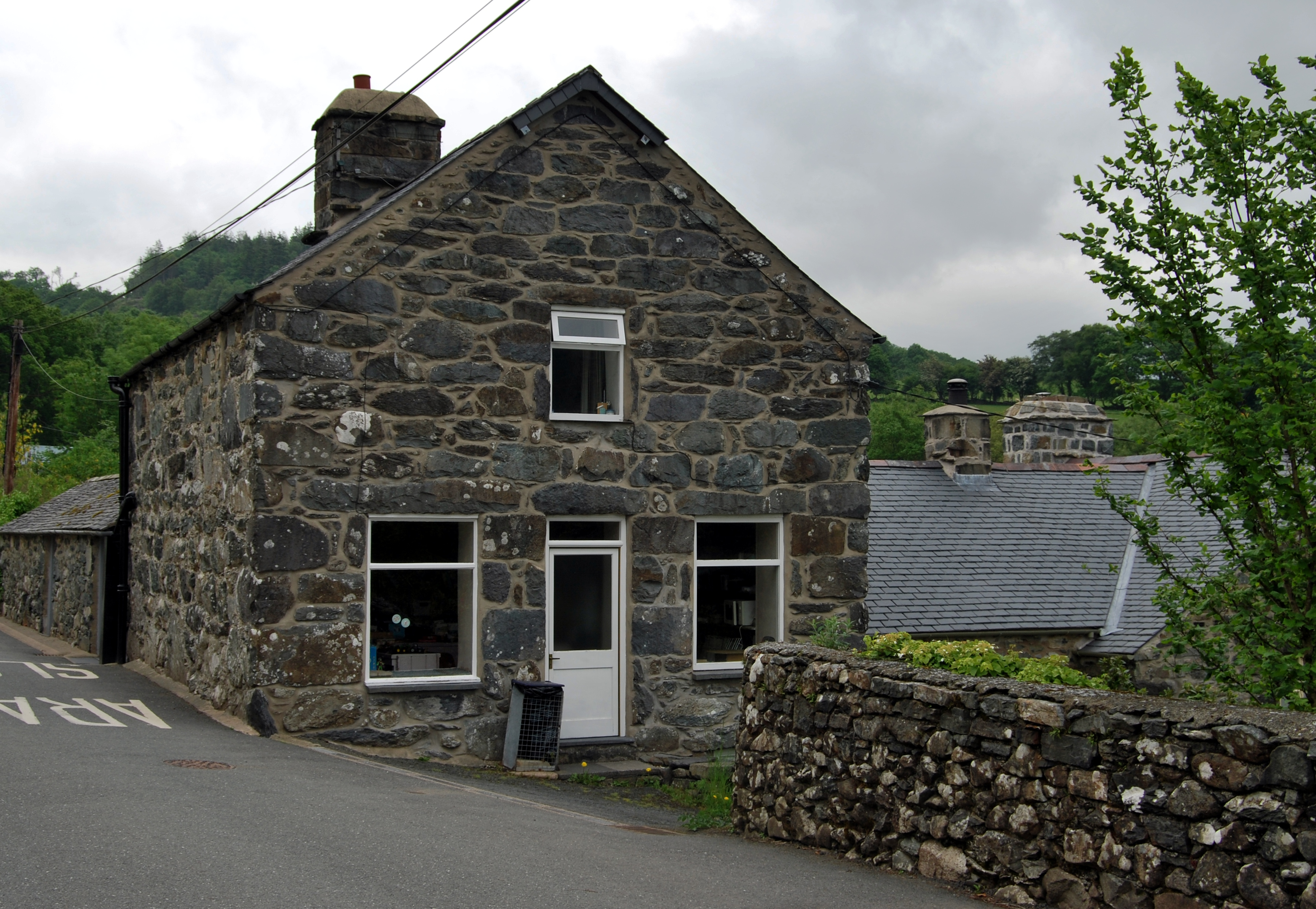
Cottage, once a shop

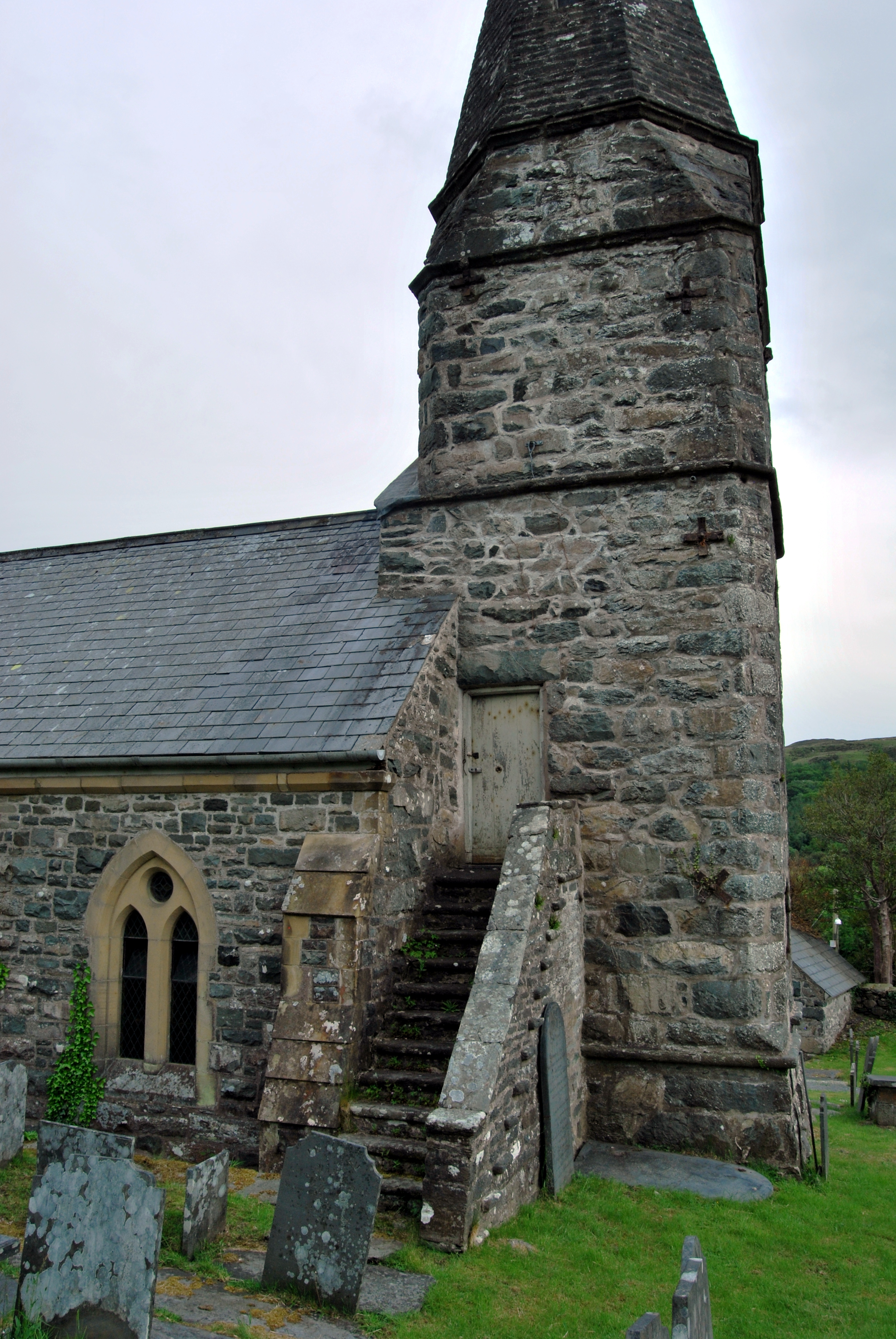
St. Mackraeth Tower. Bell Ringers entrance.

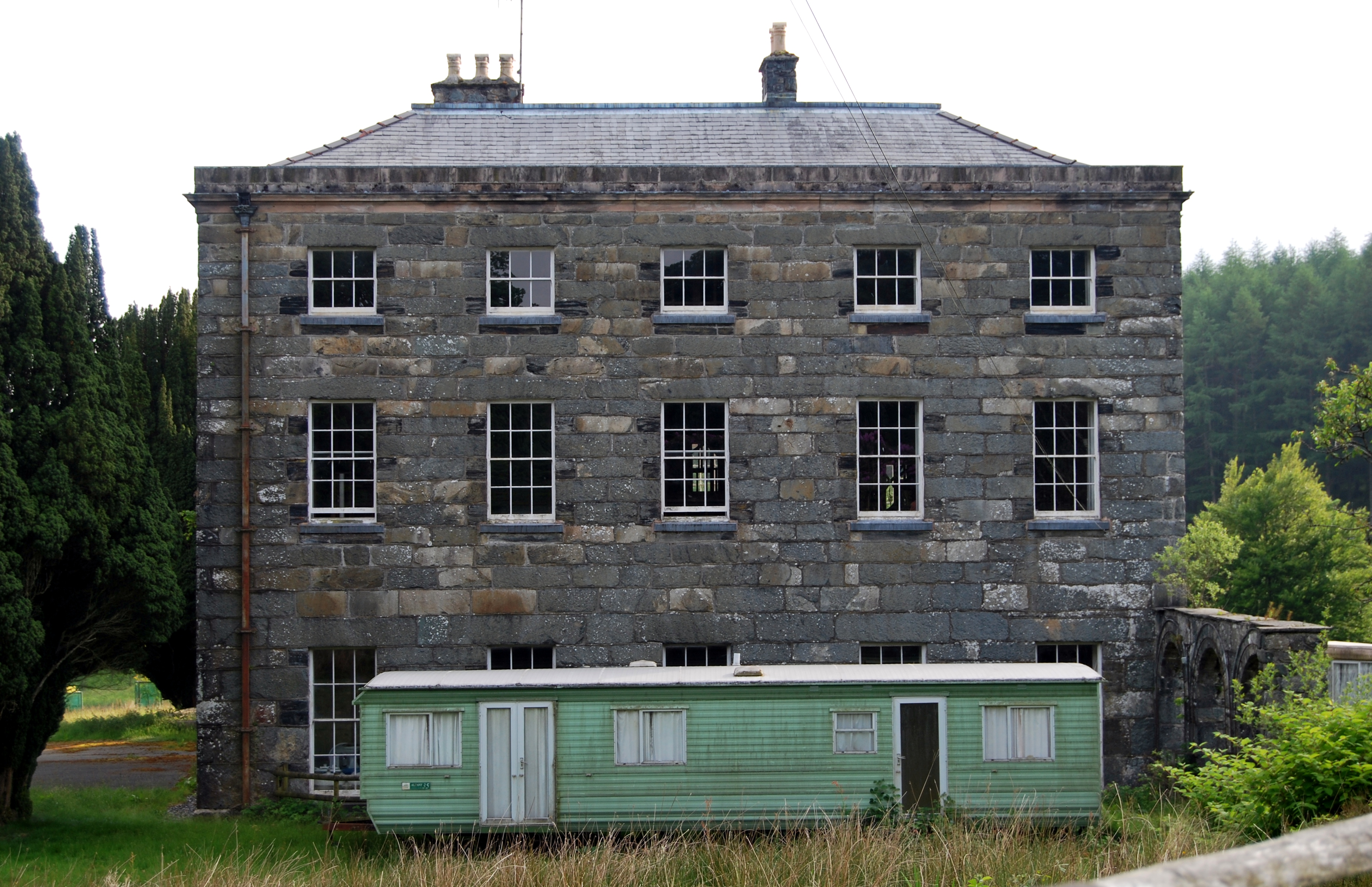
Nannau House near Llanfachreth in 2010

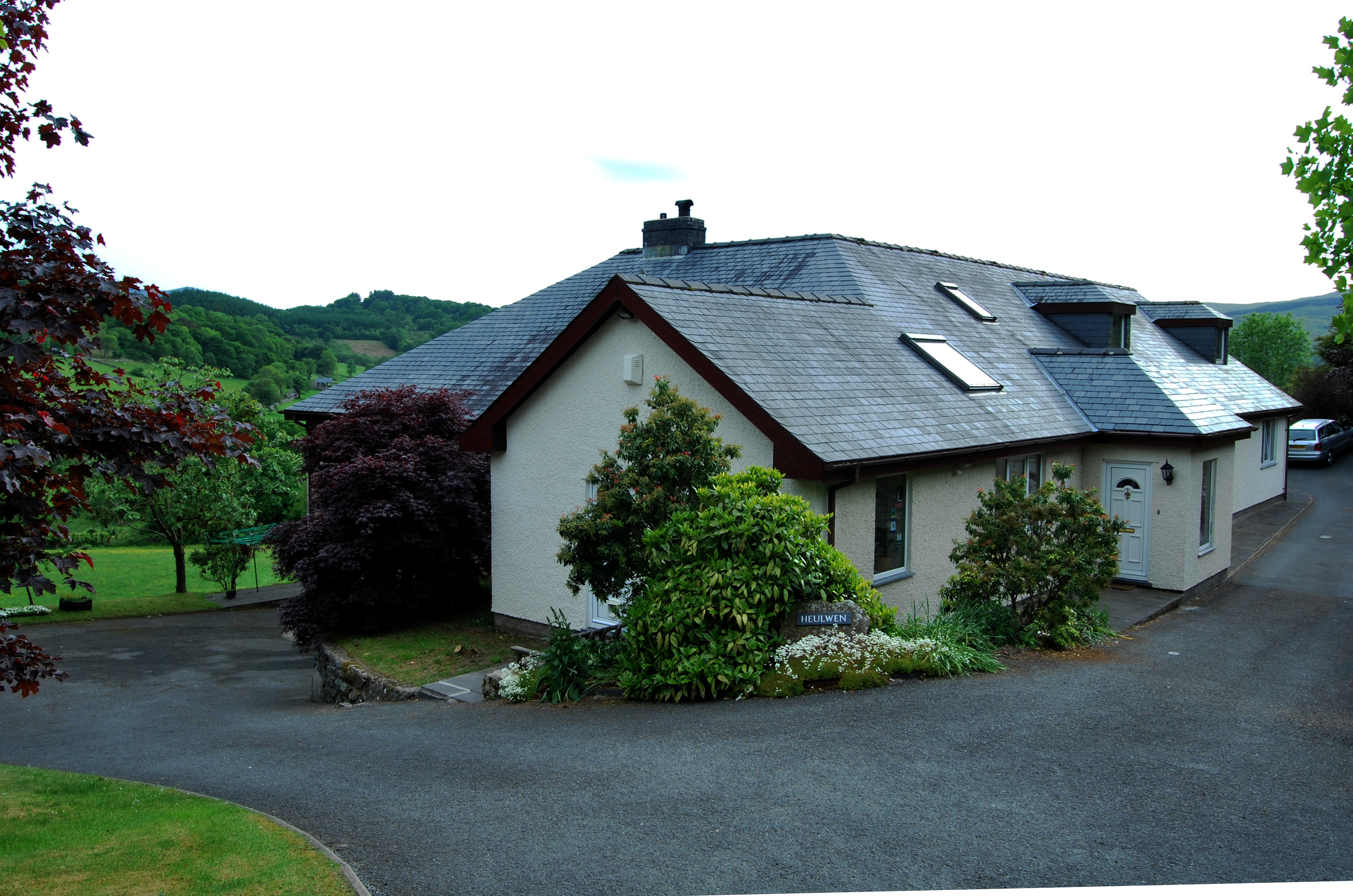
LLanfachreth, Heulwen Guest House
