= Brian Stanley =

Brian Stanley may refer to:

- Brian Stanley (historian), historian of Christian missions and world Christianity
- Brian Stanley (politician), Irish independent politician
