= John Wyn ap Cadwaladr =

John Wyn ap Cadwaladr was the member of Parliament for the constituency of Merioneth in 1559.
