= Rhys Vaughan =

Rhys Vaughan was the member of Parliament for the constituency of Merioneth in 1545.
