= Penrhyndeudraeth =

Town in Gwynedd, Wales

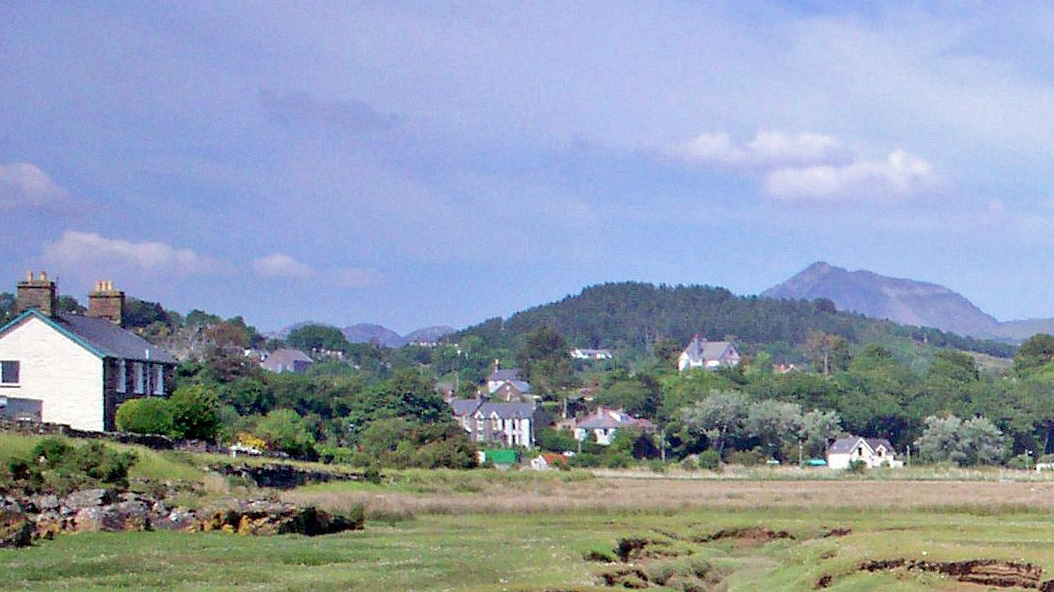
- Penrhyndeudraeth, from the river Dwyryd

- Location within Gwynedd
- Area: 7.65 km^{2} (2.95 sq mi)
- Population: 2,150 (2011)
  - Density: 281/km^{2} (730/sq mi)
- OS grid reference: SH611388
- Community: Penrhyndeudraeth
- Principal area: Gwynedd
- Country: Wales
- Sovereign state: United Kingdom
- Post town: PENRHYNDEUDRAETH
- Postcode district: LL48
- Dialling code: 01766
- Police: North Wales
- Fire: North Wales
- Ambulance: Welsh
- UK Parliament: Dwyfor Meirionnydd
- Senedd Cymru – Welsh Parliament: Dwyfor Meirionnydd
- List of places UK Wales Gwynedd 52.929°N 4.066°W Map of the community

Penrhyndeudraeth (Welsh pronunciation: [pɛnr̥ɨnˈdeɨ̯draːɨ̯θ]; lit. 'peninsula with two beaches'; or simply Penrhyn) is a small town and community in the county of Gwynedd, in Wales. The community includes the villages of Minffordd and Portmeirion, which together had a population of 2,150 at the 2011 census. The town lies close to the mouth of the river Dwyryd on the A487, 3 miles (4.8 km) east of Porthmadog.

== History ==
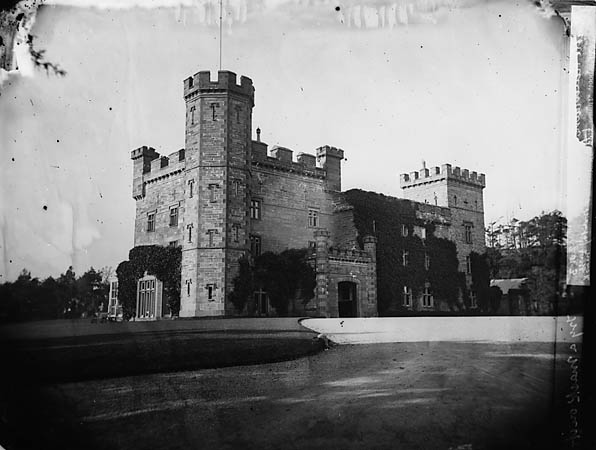
Castell Deudraeth (1875)

An older settlement of a few cottages at Upper Penrhyn was originally called Cefn Coch ('Red Ridge'); that name is perpetuated by the Penrhyndeudraeth primary school, which is known as Ysgol Cefn Coch, but the town proper is comparatively modern. The ground on which it stands was a malarial swamp, encircling a huge stagnant pool.

The present town owes its existence as a commercial centre to a local landowner, David Williams of Castell Deudraeth near Minffordd; in the mid-19th century, he drained the swamp, dried the pool and constructed many streets. Adopting a scheme of town planning evolved by the builder of Tremadog and his Italian craftsmen, Williams gave Penrhyndeudraeth broad streets and wide open spaces. The main square is a road junction with choice of four roads: one leading to the station, one to Porthmadog, one to Maentwrog, and the other to Llanfrothen and the Pass of Aberglaslyn. Williams' daughter, Alice, built the first Institute Hall for one of the first British Women's Institutes in the country in Penrhyndeudraeth.

Prior to the many 19th century land reclamation projects, including The Cob at Porthmadog and the building of the Ffestiniog Railway, both of which spurred economic growth, the few local inhabitants relied on agriculture and small-scale copper mining. Some men worked boats on the Dwyryd, carrying slate from Maentwrog to the sea for export. Local women at that time gathered cockles in the estuary for sale in local markets. Penrhyndeudraeth is still known locally, especially by the people of Blaenau Ffestiniog and Porthmadog, as Penrhyn Cocos (or "Cockletown" in English).

Halfway between Penrhyndeudraeth and Minffordd, next to the Snowdonia National Park HQ, is Hendre Hall where, in 1648, Humphrey Humphreys was born. He became Bishop of Bangor from 1689 to 1701 and then of Hereford; he died in 1712. One of the family carvings at the Holy Trinity Church Penrhyndeudraeth is of him; there is also an oak chest which Richard Humphreys gave to Llanfrothen Church while working as its warden in 1690.

The property named Cae Ednyfed, between Penrhyndeudraeth and Minffordd, was once the property of Ednyfed Fychan, commander-in-chief to Llywelyn ap Iorwerth.

The town has not always been very religious. Early in the history of the Methodists, they established chapels, and fellowship meetings (seiadau) were established. There is a history of revivalists, such as Daniel Rowland who held meetings at Tyddyn Isaf and the poet Dafydd Siôn Siâms who publicly cursed the new religion before himself being converted. He chastised the Methodists mercilessly before burning all their critical poetic works in a public bonfire in the village square. The Old Methodists' original communion chalice is to be seen in the National Library in Aberystwyth. The town was originally in two Anglican parishes, Llanfrothen and Llandecwyn. Holy Trinity church was built in 1858 and a new parish of Penrhyndeudraeth was created in 1897.

For 130 years, the explosives works were the economic backbone of the town. Historically, the population depended on employment offered by the slate industry at Blaenau Ffestiniog and the trade in raw materials through the busy harbour at Porthmadog.

== Governance ==
An electoral ward of the same name provides local governance in the area; it extends north to Llanfrothen and had a total population of 2,587 in 2011.

Nationally, the area lies in the Gwynedd Maldwyn constituency for the Welsh Assembly and Dwyfor Meirionnydd for the UK Parliament.

== Economy ==
=== Explosives ===
The first explosives factory in Penrhyndeudraeth was established in 1865 as the Patent Safety Guncotton Company. It was licensed in 1875 and became part of the New Explosives Company, manufacturing explosives from guncotton, starch and India rubber. By 1908, it was the Steelite Explosives Company Ltd.

In 1915, the vast majority of the then factory was destroyed by an explosion. Along with this accident and another at Nobel’s Explosives in Scotland, Britain faced fighting the First World War with a shortage of much needed munitions.

The then newly appointed Minister for Munitions, David Lloyd George, ordered a Government requisition of the factory, which led to it being rebuilt to produce munitions and was known as HM Factory Penrhyndeudraeth, employing 349 workers.

Following the end of the First World War, production continued at the factory but, in 1921, it was closed and put up for sale. This was merely just the beginning and not the end for the factory.

Durham-born businessman, R.T. Cooke, who had coal mining interests in the north-east of England and was also the majority shareholder of the Essex-based Miner’s Safety Explosives Company was keen to capitalise on growing demand for explosives in the mining industry and wanted to start production of the much safer nitroglycerine. This however was found to be impossible at his site in Stanford-le-Hope, due to the factory being too close to a Shell oil refinery. Cooke knew he would need to locate a new factory if his venture was to succeed.

On his train journey back from Essex to Durham, Cooke came across a newspaper advertisement listing government-owned factories that were up for sale following the war. HM Factory Penrhyndeudraeth drew his eye immediately and Cooke decided to visit the site and found it was perfect for the production of nitroglycerine due to it being located in a series of valleys.

In 1922, the production of explosives restarted in Penrhyndeudraeth and became known as Cooke’s Explosives Limited. Such was the site's success, Cooke expanded the factory and subsequently decided to relocate the Miner’s Safety Explosives Company from Essex.

In 1927, the factory in Penrhyndeudraeth suffered another explosion, destroying the whole southern section of the site, which saw it unable to produce nitroglycerine. Facing the potential failure of his business being unable to fulfil orders, Cooke had no option but to seek the assistance of his then rivals, who were the only other producers of nitroglycerine, the newly-formed industrial giant, Imperial Chemical Industries (ICI).

ICI agreed to fulfil Cooke's nitroglycerine orders whilst the factory in Penrhyndeudraeth was rebuilt, on the condition that they could buy a majority stake in Cooke's Explosives Company. Cooke agreed and was allowed to stay on at the company as a managing director.

The outbreak of the Second World War ensured that Cooke's explosives company was once again at the forefront of the war effort, producing an estimated 17 million hand grenades between 1939 and 1945.

Following the war, the factory returned to producing Nitroglycerine once again, employing over 300 people. In 1957, the site's third serious accident since its inception occurred, leading to further damage to its production facilities. The four workers killed in the blast were named as Elizabeth Catherine Lloyd, Annie Owen, Laura Williams and Eric Evans.

In 1958, Cooke retired and ICI bought the remaining shares in Cooke's Explosives Company, now making it a fully-owned subsidiary within the Explosives division, known as Nobel’s Explosives Company Ltd; it also had an extensive production site in Ardeer, in Ayrshire. Although now a part of ICI, the factory was still known as "Cooke’s Works".

The Cooke name lives on in Penrhyndeudraeth, as the name of a small industrial estate on part of the former factory site.

ICI's priority following its full acquisition of Cooke's Explosives was to introduce safer methods of working and heavily investing in modern technology, leading to some automation and remote control of production processes, with the aim of preventing another catastrophic accident that had blighted the factory over the decades.

This level of investment in the factory led ICI to relocate its nitroglycerine production from its site in Ardeer, Scotland, and base it exclusively at Penrhyndeudraeth.

By the 1970s, the factory in Penrhyndeudraeth supplied 90% of the explosives for the British coal industry in the form of nitroglycerine-based explosive products. The prolonged miners' strike of 1984, and the competition from foreign coal imports, resulted in wholesale pit closures; this, in turn, reduced the demand for mining explosives to the point where production was no longer economic. The site was finally closed in 1995 and cleared in 1997, bringing nearly 130 years of explosives production at the site to an end.

The site is now in the hands of the North Wales Wildlife Trust as a nature reserve notable for the presence in summer of nightjars. The nature reserve is officially known as Gwaith Powdwr (Powder Works), a befitting homage to its explosive industrial past ensuring its continued place firmly in the history books.

Many people died in accidents at the works; there is a slate plaque at the top of the factory site known locally as "Klondike" to commemorate them and everyone who worked there.

=== Granite ===
Another 19th-century industry in the district is Garth Quarry at Minffordd, established in 1870 to make granite setts for road building in towns and cities. Like the explosives industry, the quarry relied heavily on the coming of the Cambrian Railways in 1872. The quarry is still operational, and owned by Breedon Group, producing roadstone and railway ballast.

== Transport ==
Penrhyndeudraeth station

The town has two railway stations:

- Penrhyndeudraeth, on the southern side of the village on the Cambrian Coast Railway; Transport for Wales operates services between Pwllheli, Machynlleth, Shrewsbury and Birmingham International
- Penrhyn, to the north on the A4085 on the preserved narrow-gauge Ffestiniog Railway; services operate between Blaenau Ffestiniog and Porthmadog Harbour.

Penrhyndeudraeth is served by several bus routes, operated by Lloyds Coaches and Llew Jones; these link the town with Aberystwyth, Bangor, Barmouth, Blaenau Ffestiniog, Caernarfon, Criccieth, Harlech and Portmadog.

The town lies at the junction of the A487 with the A4085, which connects with Beddgelert and Caernarfon. The first section of this road is very narrow and rises steeply through Upper Penrhyn; in places, it is so narrow that only a single vehicle can pass.

To the south is the new Pont Briwet bridge providing a short-cut to the Harlech road; it is shared with the railway. A new £20m road and railway bridge was opened in 2015, replacing the old wooden structure. For generations, the Grade II-listed Pont Briwet carried the railway, allowing people to cross Afon Dwyryd from Penrhyndeudraeth to Llandecwyn along a narrow road suitable for cars only. The new bridge allows all road vehicles to cross and the original toll is no longer applied.

== Culture ==
=== Folklore ===
The area around Penrhyndeudraeth has a number of mythological or folkloric legends associated with it. In one legend, a servant called Dafydd Fawr is tasked with escorting a young maiden on an evening journey from a house in Penrhyndeudraeth (named as Tyddyn Heilyn), to her home at Penrhyn Isaf.

Walking behind his young mistress, Dafydd sees a brilliant meteor in the night sky followed by a ring or hoop of fire. Dafydd also sees a handsomely dressed lady and gentleman of small stature stood within the hoop, embracing each other with one arm and taking hold of the hoop with the other, their feet resting on the concave surface of the ring. Dafydd watches as the hoop descends to the earth and the two small beings jump out and immediately begin to make a circle on the ground. As soon as the circle is finished, a large number of men and women instantly appear and dance round and round the circle, illuminated by a strange subdued light and accompanied by the sweetest music that Dafydd had ever heard.

As Dafydd watches on the meteor appears once more, with the fiery hoop again trailing behind it. When the hoop reaches the dancers, the small lady and gentleman who had arrived inside it jump back in and the hoop disappears from sight in the same manner as it had arrived. As it vanishes so do the other dancers, leaving Dafydd alone in the darkness, as the young maiden seemingly unaware of the events had walked on. Dafydd makes his way back to Penrhyn Isaf where he is asked to explain his delay. In answering, Dafydd surmises that the young maiden was only out of his sight for about three minutes, but is astonished to find that he had been absent for three hours.

The young maiden of the legend would go on to marry Robert Jones of Llanfyllin and become the mother of the writer Rev. Robert Jones. Her son would relate his mother's stories to the folklorist Rev. Elias Owen, who stated that she was "a lady whose mind was well stored with tales of by-gone times" and that as well as her personal experience, she knew of an older legend related to the same area.

In the older tale, a mortal man falls in love with a beautiful fairy lady, and asks her to marry him. The lady agrees to do so but warns him that if he ever touches her with iron, she will leave him forever immediately. Thinking little of the warning, the man marries his love and they happily live together for many years, even raising several children. One day when crossing Traeth Mawr on horseback, the man's horse became agitated and jerks his head towards the woman. With this, the iron bit of the bridle touches her left arm and she tells her husband that they must now part forever. Distressed, the man implores his wife not to leave, first as her husband, then as the mother of their children. Despite this, the woman disappears and is never seen again.

=== Welsh language ===
There are many language traces of Old Welsh to be found in the place names in the Penrhyndeudraeth area, such as Pont Briwet /Briwet Bridge. (Note: Briwet is cognate with the Breton word "Brued", meaning bridge.) Remains of old huts can be found near Ty’n y Berllan, which date back to the Bronze Age.

According to the 2011 Census, Penrhyndeudraeth is the 19th most Welsh-speaking community in Wales, with approximately 76% of its residents aged three years or older stating that they could speak Welsh. According to the 2026 Estyn inspection report of the village's primary school, Ysgol Cefn Coch, 65% of pupils come from homes where Welsh is spoken.

In an incident in June 2011, with new English landlords of the Royal Oak public house, customers left the pub in anger and were threatened with an airgun after being told to stop ordering their drinks in Welsh. The pub subsequently had a change of management.

=== Arts ===
The Penrhyndeudraeth Children and Young People's Chaired Eisteddfod is held annually at the Memorial Hall. The village is home to the Snowdonia National Park Authority headquarters.

Penrhyndeudraeth's Alun 'Sbardun' Huws wrote a song, Strydoedd Aberstalwm (approximately "streets of long ago"), in tribute to the village. His well-known band Y Tebot Piws also recorded their farewell album at Penrhyndeudraeth Memorial Hall in 2011.

== Sport ==
Penrhyndeudraeth F.C. play in the second division of the Welsh Alliance League. In 2011-12, they were league champions of the Gwynedd League, and won the Gwynedd Safeflue and Bob Owen Memorial Shields. In 2012-13, they won the Take Stock Van Hire Cup. The junior teams all play in the Llyn and Eifionydd Junior Football League.

== Notable residents ==
- Nathaniel Jones (1832–1905), poet and Calvinistic Methodist minister in the village from 1865
- Alice Williams (1863–1957), Welsh bard, painter, and voluntary welfare worker; born in Castell Deudraeth
- Bertrand Russell (1872–1970), philosopher, lived at Plas Penrhyn in the village from 1956 until his death
- Fanny Winifred Edwards (1876–59), schoolmistress and Welsh-language author
- Rupert Crawshay-Williams (1908–77), British philosopher, great-grandson of "Darwin's Bulldog" Thomas Henry Huxley
- Alun "Sbardun" Huws (1948–2014), founding member of the Welsh rock band Y Tebot Piws, songwriter, and programme director at HTV and BBC Wales, grew up in the village.

== Gallery ==
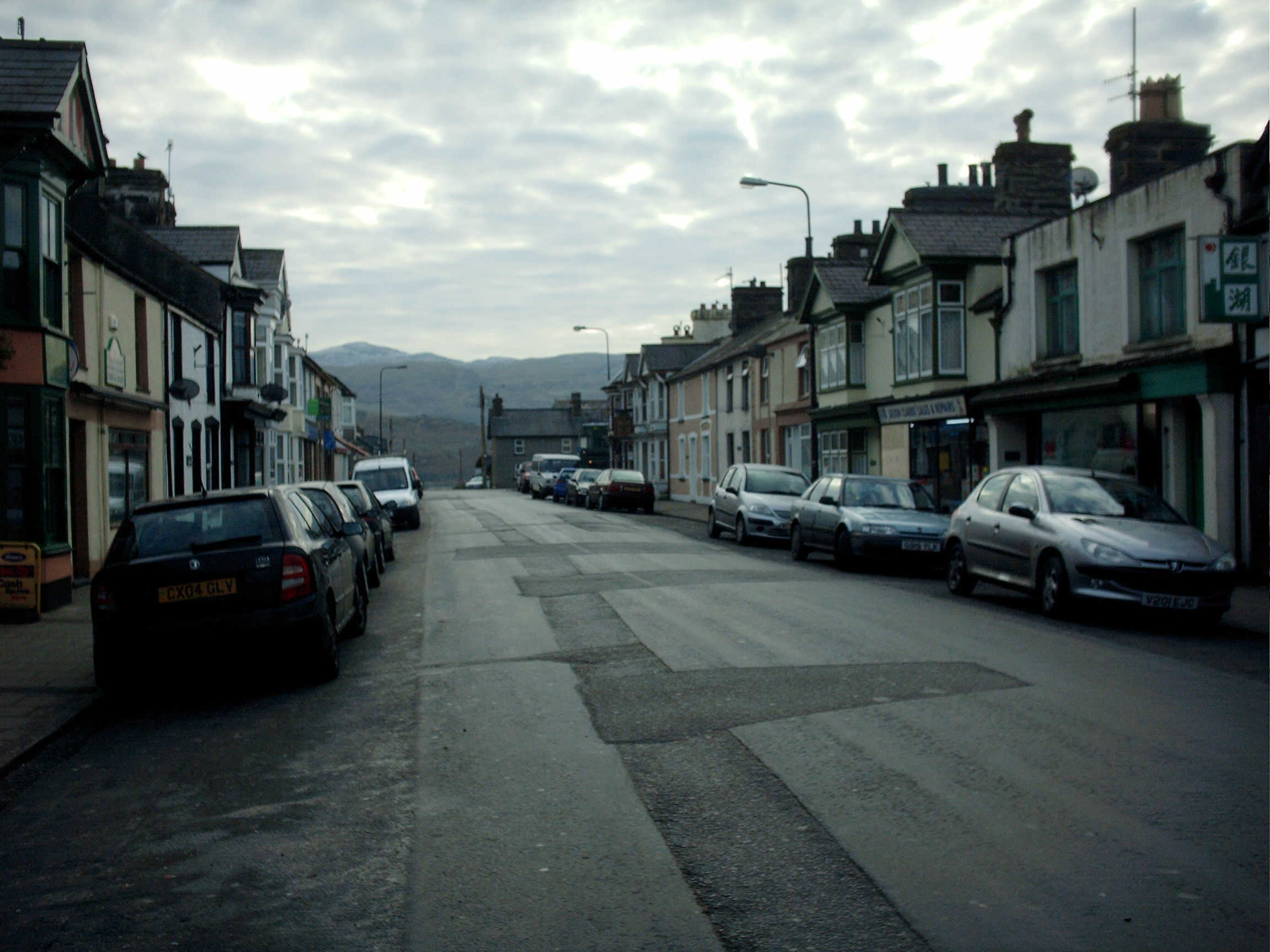
High Street

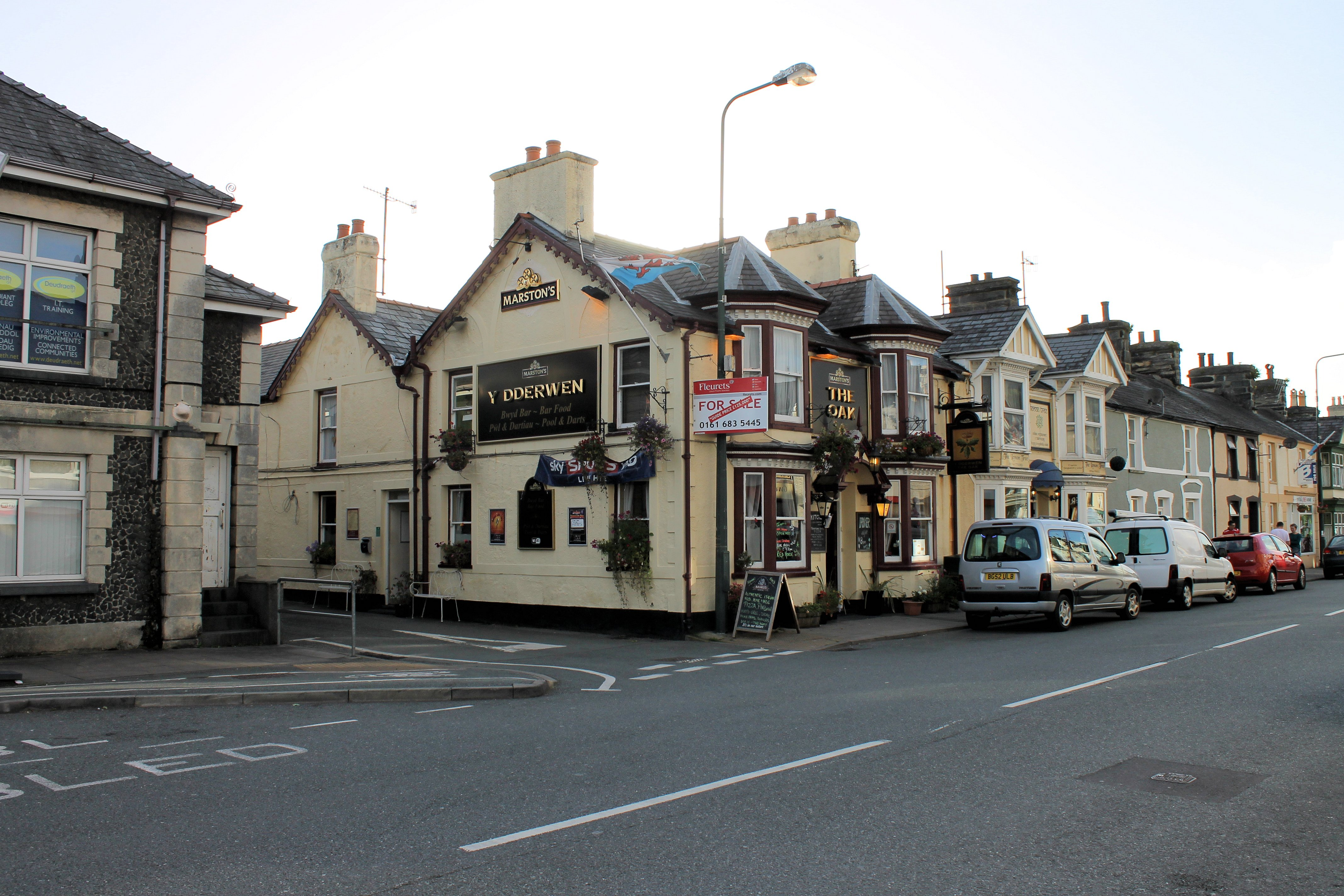
The oak pub

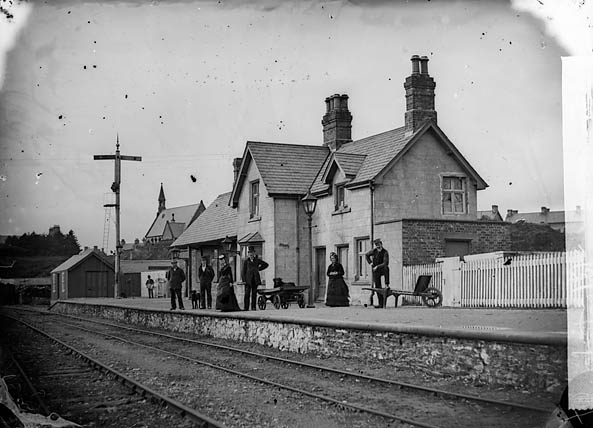
The railway station in 1875

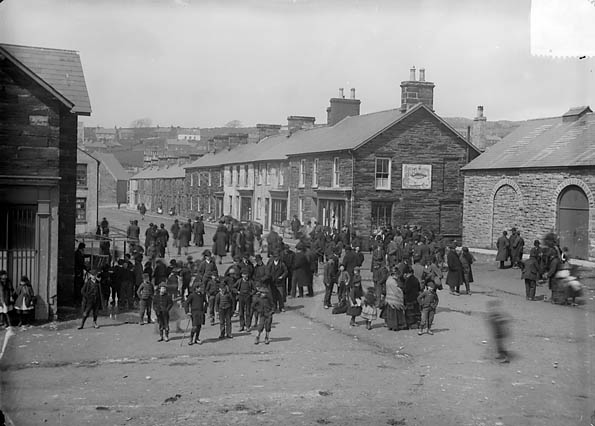
The fair in 1888

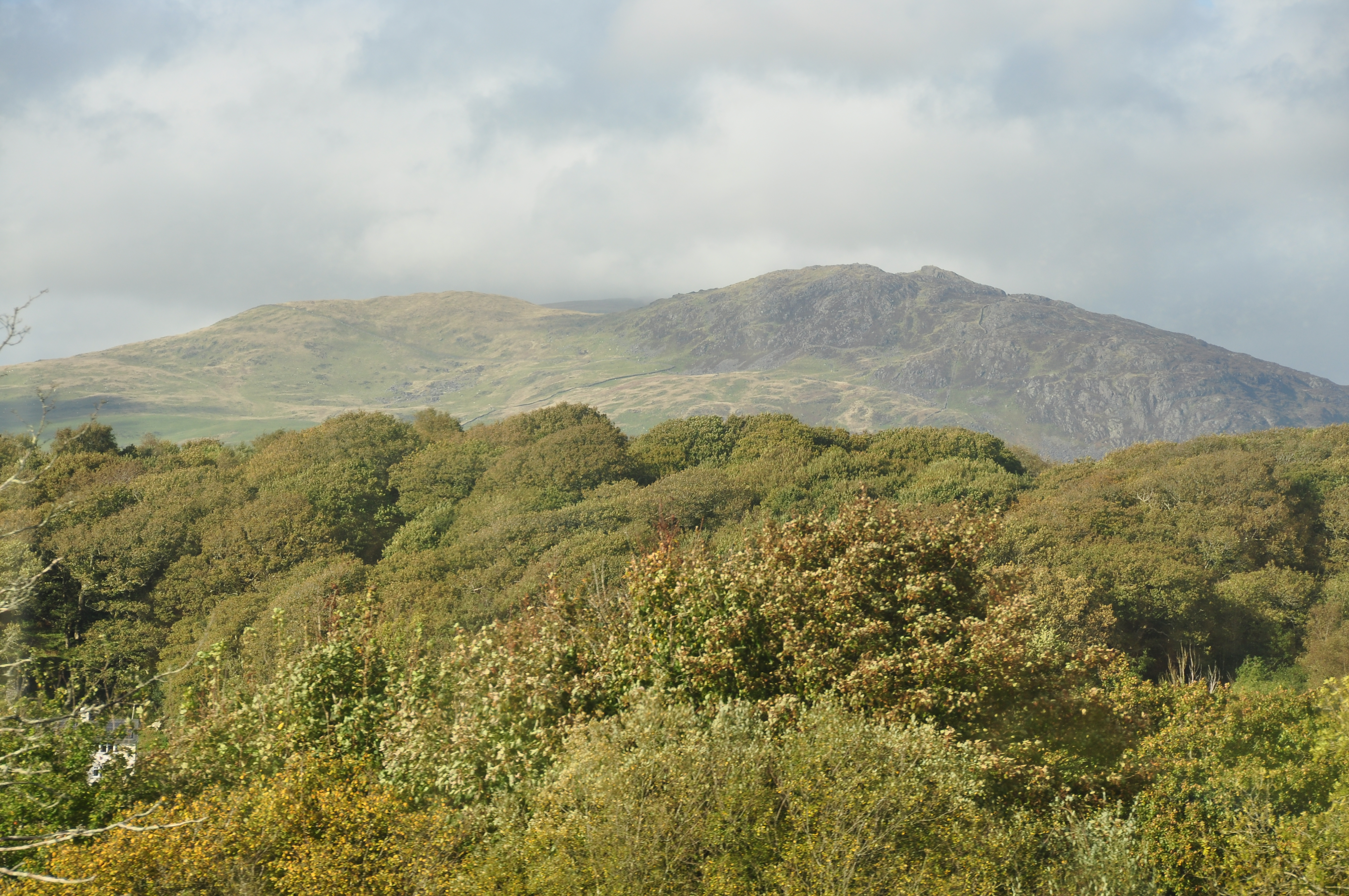
Nearby woodland and mountain

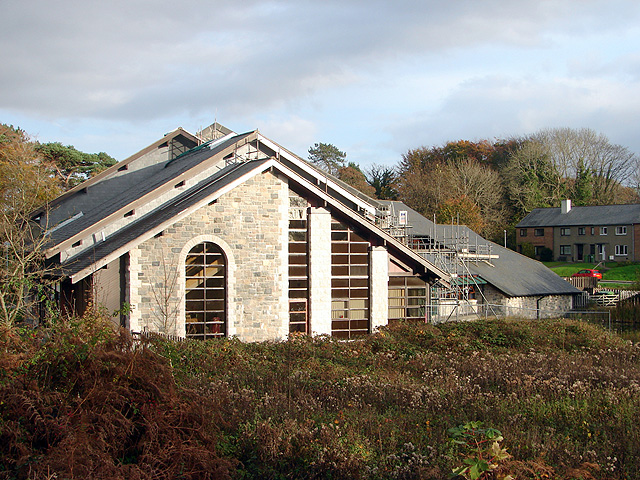
Snowdonia National Park HQ

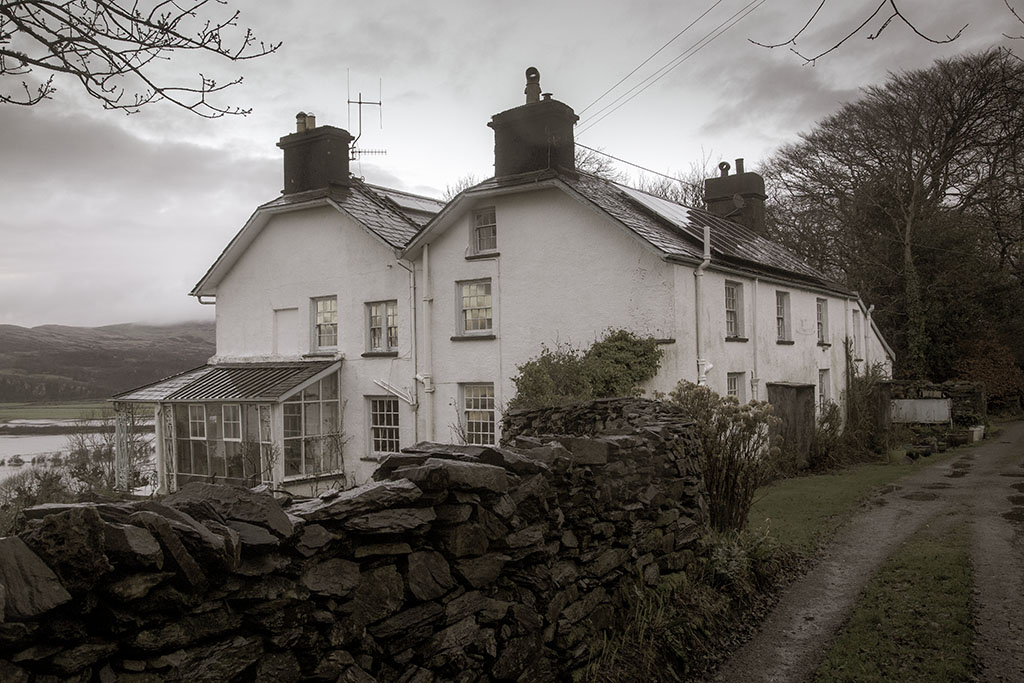
Plas Penrhyn, home of Bertrand Russell, in 2020

== See also ==
- List of buildings and structures in Portmeirion
