= Williams baronets of Castell Deudraeth and Borthwen (1909) =

Escutcheon of the Williams baronets of Castell Deudraeth and Borthwen

The Williams baronetcy, of Castell Deudrath and Borthwen in the County of Merioneth, was created in the Baronetage of the United Kingdom on 28 July 1909 for Osmond Williams, son of David Williams. He sat as Liberal Member of Parliament for Merionethshire from 1900 to 1910, and served as Lord Lieutenant of Merionethshire. The title became extinct with the death of the 2nd Baronet in 2012.

== Williams baronets, of Castell Deudraeth and Borthwen (1909) ==
- Sir (Arthur) Osmond Williams, 1st Baronet (1849–1927)
- Sir (Michael) Osmond Williams, 2nd Baronet (1914–2012), died leaving no male heir.

== Notes ==
Baronetage of the United Kingdom
Preceded by Scott baronets	Williams baronets of Castell Deudraeth and Borthwen; 28 July 1909	Succeeded by Williamson baronets
