= Alice Williams (welfare worker) =

Welsh bard, painter, and welfare worker (1863–1957)

Alice Williams CBE
- Alice Williams
- Born: Alice Helena Alexandra Williams; 12 March 1863; Castell Deudraeth, Penrhyndeudraeth, Wales
- Died: 15 August 1957 (aged 94); Chelsea
- Other names: Alys Meirion
- Known for: Welsh bard, painter and voluntary welfare worker
- Partner: Fanny Mowbray Laming
- Parent(s): Annie and David Williams
- Relatives: Sir Arthur Osmond Williams (brother)

Alice Helena Alexandra Williams, also known as Alys Meirion, CBE (12 March 1863 – 15 August 1957), was a Welsh bard, painter, humanitarian, and voluntary welfare worker.

== Life ==
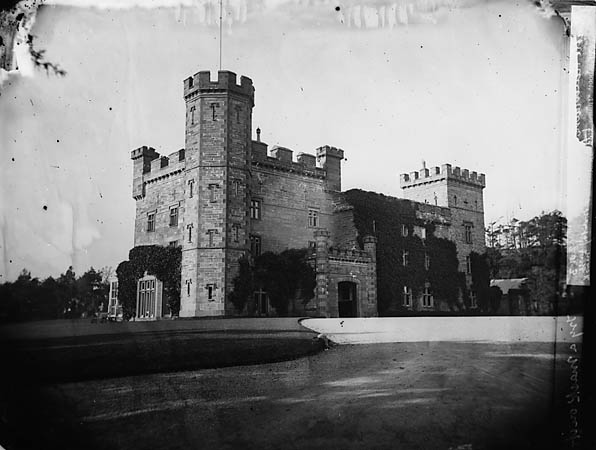
Her birthplace, Castell Deudraeth, in 1875

Williams was born in Castell Deudraeth at Penrhyndeudraeth to Annie Louisa Loveday and David Williams. Her father was a Liberal Party politician and landowner. She was the youngest daughter, and although her parents had liberal views, she was expected to care for her mother. In 1900, her brother, Sir Arthur Osmond Williams, succeeded their father as MP, and he went on to support women's suffrage. She was released from the task of caring for her mother when the latter died in 1904. Williams set out to complete her relatively poor education with travel.

She joined the Lyceum, a newly founded social club for women, in London in 1905 and went on to develop branches in Berlin that year and, in 1907, in Paris, her main home until the First World War. She exhibited her watercolours in France and in London.

In Paris, several years later, she met Fanny Mowbray Laming, a musician and public speaker, who became her life companion. In 1914, the First World War started, and during the war, Williams worked for the French Wounded Emergency Fund. Williams helped to create a Missing Persons Unit known as the "Signal Bureau". This earned her a Médaille de la Reconnaissance Française from the French government.

Williams was the chair of one of the first British branches of the Women's Institute at Penrhyndeudraeth. This group built the first Institute Hall. In 1917, the National Federeation of Women Institutes was formed. On 16 October Lady Denman and Grace Hadow were elected chair and vice-chair and Williams was elected honorary secretary and treasurer. Williams was the only volunteer in this role as in 1918 she was replaced by a paid general secretary. She was moved to the executive committee and the following year the NFWI published its first magazine titled ''Home and Country'' and Williams was its first editor. The first edition showed the Queen visiting the W.I. exhibition.

Williams was a member of Union des femmes peintres et sculpteurs and of Union Internationale des Aquarellistes.

She wrote a play, Britannia, which was staged by the Women's Institute in Penrhyndeudraeth. More importantly the play was translated into Welsh by Ceridwen Peris. Williams was made a bard under the name Alys Meirion.

Williams' eyesight began to fail, and she was blind by 1930. Williams was awarded the CBE in 1937.

== Death ==
Alice Williams died in Chelsea in 1957, aged 94.

== Works include ==
- Aunt Mollie's Story (1913)
- Britannia (1917)
- Britain Awake: An Empire Pageant Play (1932)
- Gossip (1935)
