= Sir Osmond Williams, 1st Baronet =

British politician

Sir Osmond Williams Bt JP DL
- Williams, c. 1905

Lord Lieutenant of Merionethshire
- In office 22 March 1909 – 28 January 1927
- Preceded by: W. R. M. Wynne
- Succeeded by: The Lord Harlech

Member of Parliament for Merioneth
- In office 1900–1910
- Preceded by: Owen Morgan Edwards
- Succeeded by: Sir Henry Haydn Jones

Personal details
- Born: Arthur Osmond Wynn Williams; 17 March 1849 Llanfihangel-y-Traethau, Merionethshire, Wales
- Died: 28 January 1927 (aged 77) Australia
- Party: Liberal
- Spouse: Frances Evelyn Greaves (m. 1880; died 1926)
- Relations: Alice Williams (sister); Leonard Williams (brother); Dacre Smyth (grandson)
- Children: 6
- Parent(s): David Williams; Anne Louisa Loveday Williams
- Education: Eton College

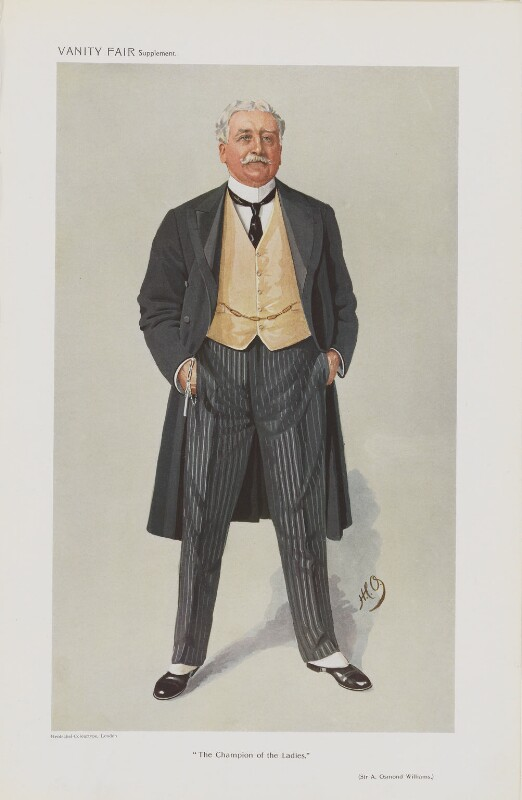
"The Champion of the Ladies", caricature by HCO in Vanity Fair, 1909.

Sir Arthur Osmond Wynn Williams JP DL (17 March 1849 – 28 January 1927) was a Welsh Liberal Party politician. He became Constable of Harlech Castle, and Lord Lieutenant of Merionethshire.

== Early life ==
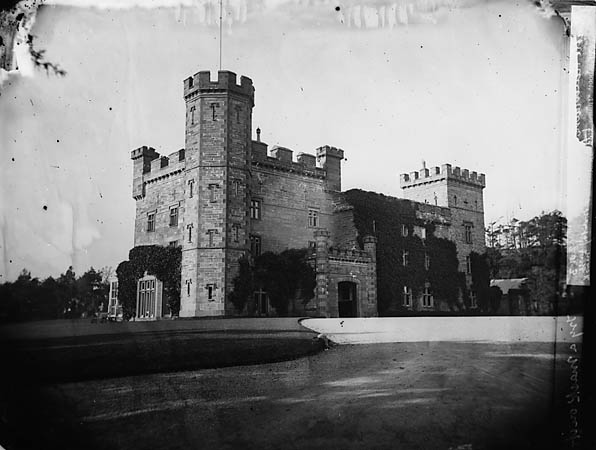
His seat, Castell Deudraeth, in 1875

He was born at Llanfihangel-y-Traethau, Merionethshire, Wales on 17 March 1849. He was the eldest surviving son of Anne Louisa (née Loveday) Williams and David Williams, M.P. for Merioneth from 1868 to 1869. Among his siblings was brother Dr. Leonard Williams, the prominent physician and writer, and sister Alice Williams, the painter and welfare worker.

Williams grew on the family estate Castell Deudraeth and was educated at Eton.

== Career ==
He was elected as Liberal M.P. for Merioneth at the 1900 general election and held the seat until 1910.

Williams served as Justice of the Peace and Deputy Lieutenant for Caernarvonshire, Chairman of Quarter Sessions for Merioneth, and constable of Harlech Castle. In 1909, he was created a baronet of Castell Deudraeth and Borthwen, and from 22 March 1909 to 28 January 1927, he served as Lord Lieutenant of Merionethshire.

== Personal life ==
On 3 August 1880, he married Frances Evelyn Greaves (1855–1926) in Lillington, Warwickshire. She was a daughter of John Whitehead Greaves and Ellen (née Stedman) Greaves. Together, they were the parents of six children, including:

- David Osmond Deudraeth Williams (1882–1882), who died in infancy.
- Capt Osmond Trahairn Deudraeth Williams (1883–1915), who married Lady Gladys Margaret Finch-Hatton (1882–1964), the only daughter of Henry Finch-Hatton, 13th Earl of Winchilsea and Annie Jane Codrington (eldest daughter of Admiral of the Fleet Sir Henry Codrington). He served in the South African War and was killed in action in the Great War during the Battle of Loos. had issue Sir Michael Osmond Williams, 2nd Baronet.
- Evelyn Oliven Williams (1884–1960), who married Maj. Gen. Sir Nevill Smyth.
- Lawrence Trevor Greaves Williams (1885–1930), who died unmarried.
- Annie Salizma Loveday Williams (b. 1891)
- Ellen Dolga Dormie Williams (b. 1891), who married Capt. Robert Gordon Beazley, brother of Hugh Loveday Beazley.

Lady Williams died on 10 August 1926. Sir Osmond died in Australia on 28 January 1927. He was succeeded in the baronetcy by his grandson, Michael Osmond Williams, 2nd Baronet (1914–2012), who married Benitha Mary Booker, daughter of George Henry Booker.

Parliament of the United Kingdom
Preceded by Owen Morgan Edwards	Member of Parliament for Merioneth; 1900 – January 1910	Succeeded by Sir Henry Haydn Jones
Honorary titles
Preceded by W. R. M. Wynne	Lord Lieutenant of Merionethshire; 1909–1927	Succeeded by The Lord Harlech
Baronetage of the United Kingdom
New creation	Baronet (of Castell Deudraeth and Borthwen); 1909–1927	Succeeded by Sir Michael Osmond Williams
