= Campanile, Portmeirion =

Belltower in Gwynedd, Wales

Campanile
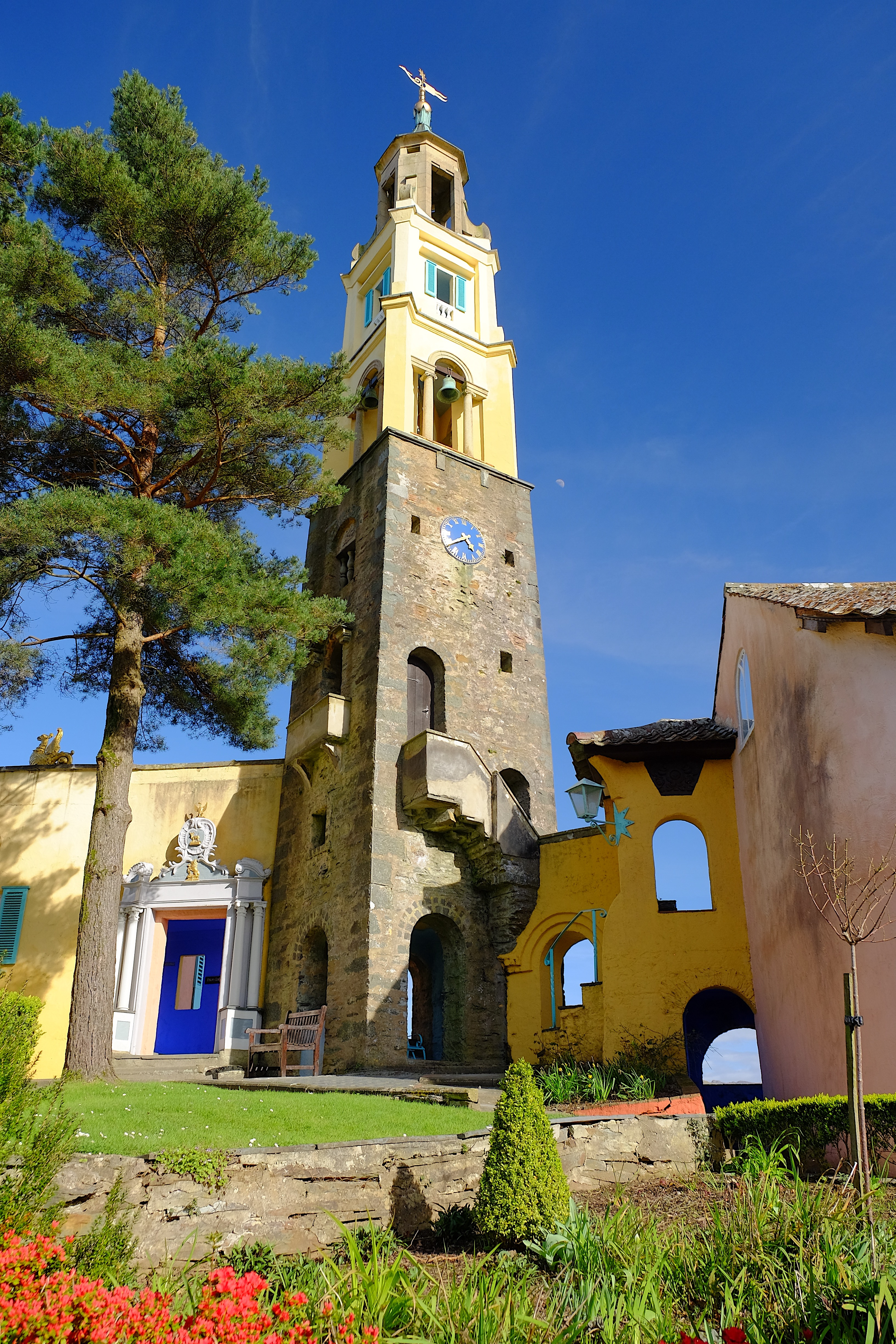
- Campanile or Bell Tower
- Interactive map of the Campanile area

General information
- Coordinates: 52°54′47.6″N 04°05′54.5″W
- Construction started: 1925
- Completed: 1928

The Campanile or Bell Tower (Welsh: Y Tŵr Clychau) is a prominent structure in the village of Portmeirion, in Gwynedd, northwest Wales. Portmeirion was created as an Italianate village by the architect, Clough Williams-Ellis, who bought the Aber Iâ mansion and its estate in 1925 as the location for his project, building his eccentric, eclectic village between 1925 and 1975. The Campanile is a Grade II* listed building.

== Construction and design ==
Construction of the Campanile started in 1925 and was completed in 1928. It used stone from a 12th-century castle, the remains which lay a short distance to the west of the village (and which had been demolished circa 1869). A plaque at the base of the tower ironically reads "This tower, built by Clough Williams-Ellis, architect and publican, embodies stones from the 12th century castle of his ancestor Gruffydd ap Cynan, King of North Wales ...It was finally razed c. 1869 by Sir William Fothergill Cook, inventor of the Electric Telegraph, 'lest the ruins should become known and attract visitors to the place.'"

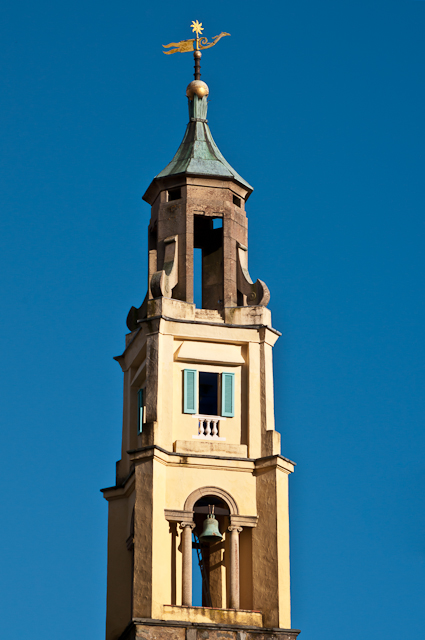
Detail of upper levels

At seven-storeys in height, Williams-Ellis planned the tower to be the most prominent building and focal point for his new village. Displaying his knowledge of architecture, the tower is in a classical design, similar to the Italian church towers it set out to imitate. The four lower levels are in bare stone and the upper three levels are plastered. The lowest of the plastered levels (level five) has a bell hanging in each of its Serlian window openings. The tower is topped by an octagonal cupola. At the apex of the copper roof is a golden ball and, on top of that, a weather vane.

The tower also includes a clock salvaged from a London brewery, which chimes on the hour. There are clock faces on the east and west of the third level.

Unusually for the Portmeirion buildings, the Campanile was built exactly according to the original design drawings. The plans were exhibited at the 1931 Royal Academy Summer Exhibition.

== See also ==
- List of buildings and structures in Portmeirion
- Grade II* listed buildings in Gwynedd
