= Alice Gray Jones =

Welsh writer, journal editor, temperance leader (1852–1943)

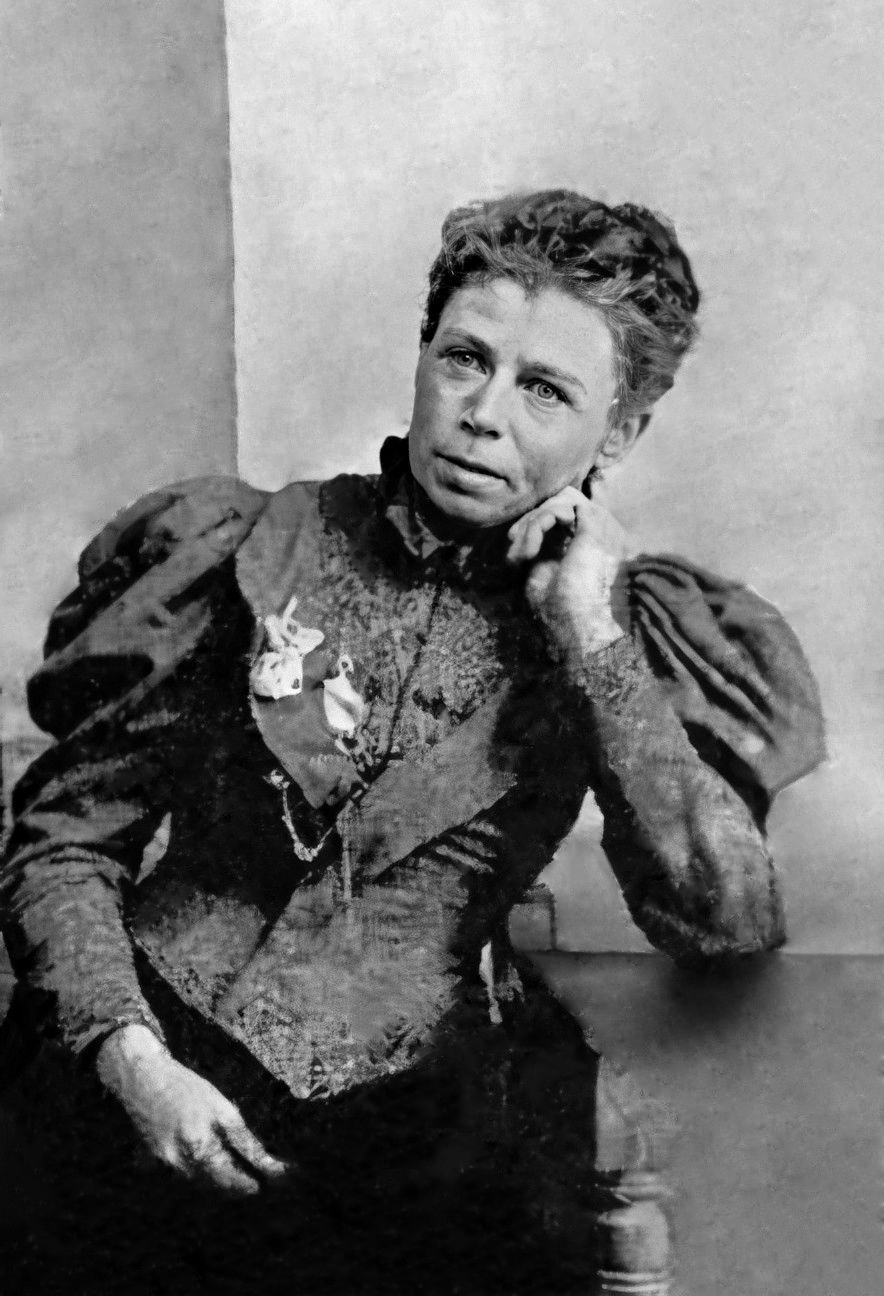
Alice Gray Jones (Ceridwen Peris) 1852-1943

Alice Gray Jones (née Jones; December 1852 – 17 April 1943), OBE was a Welsh writer and editor, known by the pseudonym Ceridwen Peris (referencing Saint Peris, the origin of placenames from her native region, such as Llanberis and Llyn Peris). She was an active temperance campaigner, and a co-founder of the North Wales Women's Temperance Union (Undeb Dirwestol Merched Gogledd Cymru).

== Early life and career ==
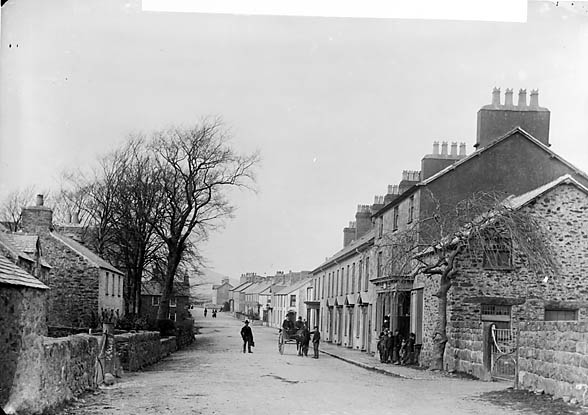
Four Crosses near Pwllheli

She was born to David and Ellen Jones in the village of Llanllyfni, Gwynedd, near Llanberis, close to where her father's family owned a woollen mill. Her mother was a cousin of the prominent minister and writer John John Roberts, known as Iolo Caernarfon.

After being educated at Dolbadarn Primary School and at Swansea Training College, she worked as a schoolteacher, eventually becoming head of the school at Dolbadarn which she had attended as a child. In 1881, she married the Rev William (or Williams) Jones. They had 4 children.

His ministry was at Four Crosses, Pwllheli, Caernarfonshire, where she was involved in organising the local Temperance Union. In 1893, she became a governor of Pwllheli County School.

== Literary career ==
The earliest of her poems in print were published in 1874, and by 1880 she was recognised as a poet, journalist and contributor to many periodicals. As "Ceridwen Peris", Jones wrote regularly for Welsh-language periodicals, including Y Frythones (edited by Sarah Jane Rees, a.k.a. Cranogwen) and Y Traethodydd. She also wrote, spoke and campaigned on behalf of the women's temperance movement.

She became editor of the Welsh-language periodical Y Gymraes (The Welshwoman) from 1896, when the publication (founded in response to the Treason of the Blue Books) was revived.

In 1901, the magazine established worthwhile links with the trade union movement, that helped to increase its circulation. Sometime before 1917 she translated Alice Williams' play into Welsh and as a result Alice was made a bard at the 1917 Eisteddfod in Birkenhead.

She gave up the editorship of Y Gymraes in 1919, when her husband retired from the ministry and the couple relocated to Criccieth. In 1921, she was awarded the OBE.

She died, aged 90, at her daughter's home in Bangor, and her papers were donated to Bangor University.

== Works ==
- Caniadau Ceridwen Peris (1934)
