= Y Stiwdio Gefn =

Welsh language music television program

Y Stiwdio Gefn (meaning The Back Studio) was a Welsh language music programme, broadcast regularly on S4C between 2013 and 2016. The programme was presented by Lisa Gwilym. Y Stiwdio Gefn showcased Welsh language music, covering a variety of music genres, usually with a small number of bands or singers sharing the studio and taking turns to perform during a half hour broadcast.

New series continued to be produced on a regular basis, as well as the occasional special edition such as in August 2014 to celebrate the 40th anniversary of the first Welsh language rock opera, Nia Ben Aur, and a December 2015 broadcast performing music written by Alun 'Sbardun' Huws.
