= List of buildings and structures in Portmeirion =

This is a list of notable buildings and structures in the village of Portmeirion, in Gwynedd, northwest Wales. Portmeirion was created as an Italianate village by the architect, Clough Williams-Ellis, who bought the Aber Iâ mansion and its estate in 1925 as the location for his project. He built his eccentric, eclectic village between 1925 and 1975. He also bought the nearby Castell Deudraeth in 1931.

Allegedly inspired by the colourful buildings of Portofino in Italy, many of Portmeirion's buildings were built on a tight budget, using salvaged and re-used materials. In 1971, forty of the fifty main buildings gained a Grade II heritage listing, one of the first examples of this happening for a still living architect.

The village is now a tourist destination with over 200,000 visitors a year.

== Listed buildings ==
Image	Name	Date completed	Description	Listing
	Portmeirion Town Hall (Hercules Hall)	1938	An imposing two-storey building in a 17th-century style, the Town Hall incorporates large amounts of dressed stone and a vaulted plasterwork ceiling salvaged from Emral Hall in Flintshire. These were bought at auction by Williams-Ellis. The vaulted ceiling depicts the Labours of Hercules (as well as the signs of the Zodiac) which give the building its alternative name of Hercules Hall.	Grade I
	Campanile (Bell Tower)	1928	Described as the most significant building in the village, the tower is seven storeys in height, construction began in 1925 with the intention of it being a focal point. The tower is in a Baroque style, incorporating stone from a nearby 12th-century castle and a chiming clock from a London brewery.	Grade II*
	The Colonnade	1959 (original c. 1760)	Originally a bath stone colonnade, part of the Arnos Court bathhouse in Bristol dating from circa 1760. The bathhouse was damaged during World War II, Williams-Ellis acquired the Colonnade and erected it in Portmeirion. A portrait head of Williams-Ellis was added by sculptor Jonah Jones.	Grade II*
	Anchor	1936	Four storey 'Mediterranean' style building, though tucked into a cliff and accessed from the road at the top floor. Attached to (and forms a pair with) Fountain (1937). Fountain is the yellow building in the picture.	Grade II
	Angel	1926		Grade II
	The Arches	1964	Originally staff accommodation and garages, it became a shop in 1965.	Grade II
	Bandstand and Hercules Steps	1961	A single storey classical loggia, though originally designed to house the village electricity substation underneath. Three flights of broad stone steps adjacent.	Grade II
	Battery	1927	A three-storey house with Kent vernacular weatherboarding to the facade. Originally called 'Block C', the ground floor was originally used as a garage.	Grade II
	The Belvedere	1960	A simple classical 2-storey house, which incorporates stained glass from Castell Deudraeth.	Grade II
	Bridge House	1959	One of the gatehouses to Portmeirion, a two-storey building over a tunnel arch.	Grade II
	Casino	1926	Listed together with the Amis Reunis boat, the Casino loggia is part of the seafront terrace in front of the Portmeirion Hotel.	Grade II
	Castell Deudraeth	1700s	A mansion on the Portmeirion Estate, bought by Clough Williams-Ellis in 1931. Reopened after extensive renovation in 2001.	Grade II
	Chantry	1937		Grade II
	Chantry Lodge	1969	Built as an office and reception building.	Grade II
	Chantry Row	1963		Grade II
	Chinese Gateway and steps	1961	A single storey pavilion in a Chinese style with an 'oriental' metal roof. Attached walls, railings and flight of stairs are also listed.	Grade II
	Cliff House	1969	A Georgian style house to the east of the village, with facades of three bays. Williams-Ellis shows his love of visual tricks, with the windows on one side of the house being false, purely to retain symmetry.	Grade II
	Corrugated iron shelter	1950s		Grade II
	Dolphin	1934	A large 3-storey building with the south elevation facing the River Dwyryd estuary.	Grade II
	Dovecote	1800s	A pre-existing circular rubble dovecote associated with the original Aber Iâ mansion.	Grade II
	Former Tollhouse	1950s		Grade II
	Fountain	1937	Three-storey house with a flat roof, adjacent to Anchor. Fountain is the pink-washed house to the right of the Anchor in the image.	Grade II
	The Gatehouse	1955	An imposing 2-storey gatehouse over a tunnel arch. It was the first post-war building and includes a ceiling mural painted by German artist, Hans Feibusch.	Grade II
	The Gazebo	1983	Built to mark the centenary of Clough William-Ellis's birth, the Gazebo was built to designs by his daughter, Susan.	Grade II
	Gloriette	1965	An imposing classical loggia, named after the building that inspired it at Schoenbrunn Palace, Vienna.	Grade II
	Gothick Pavilion	1966 (original c. 1815)	Originally a porch for Nerquis Hall in Flintshire, it was relocated to Portmeirion with amendments by Williams-Ellis.	Grade II
	Government House	1929	Built as overspill accommodation for the hotel, Government House is a large building of two sections, one of three storeys and the other of two storeys.	Grade II
	Portmeirion Hotel	c. 1850	Formerly known as the mansion of Aber Iâ, the building and its grounds were bought in 1925 by Williams-Ellis as the focus for his new village.	Grade II
	Ladies Lodge	1939	Originally a garage, the building was converted to be used as a shop.	Grade II
	The Lighthouse	1963		Grade II
	Mermaid	c. 1840	Originally a gardener's cottage for the Aber Iâ mansion, Williams-Ells decorated it in a Regency-Gothic style.	Grade II
	Neptune	1926		Grade II
	Observatory Tower	1937		Grade II
	The Pantheon and addition	1961	Also known as the Dome, due to its large octagonal dome surmounted by a cupola. on the southwest side is a large Gothic porch and to the rear is a single storey extension.	Grade II
	Prior's Lodging	1929	The two-storey building forms part of Battery Square and is named after its first tenant, the Prior of the Monastery of Caldy.	Grade II
	Rotunda and Grotto	1954	Built as a circular viewing platform, but containing a shell grotto lined with scallop shells and conches.	Grade II
	Round House and arch	1960		Grade II
	Salutation	c. 1842-1858	Originally the stable block and lodge for the Aber Iâ mansion. Later used as a shop selling Portmeirion Pottery and as a general gift shop.	Grade II
	Shelter and statue of Buddha	1964	Gold painted statue of Buddha (used for the 1958 film Inn of the Sixth Happiness) housed in a circular shelter with a decorative balustrade and a pantiled roof.	Grade II
	Telford's Tower, walls and arches	1958	A three-storey tower with a single storey range, built to mark the bicentenary of the birth of Thomas Telford.	Grade II
	Trinity	1934	A three-storey Georgian-style building, originally with garages underneath. Lately used as a shop.	Grade II
	The Unicorn	1964	An elegant, classical building, deliberately built much smaller to give an impression of a grand stately home from a distance.	Grade II
	Villa Winch	1967	A two-storey domestic building behind the Chantry, built for Clough-Ellis's friend, Captain Henry Winch.	Grade II
	Watch House	1926	A small cottage-like single-storey building, behind Dolphin, facing towards the sea.	Grade II
	White Horses	1700s/1966	An eighteenth-century cottage with a 1966 extension by Williams-Ellis. Attached to the Observatory Tower.	Grade II

== Other listed structures ==
Image	Name	Date completed	Description	Listing
	Amis Reunis	1930	A recreation in concrete, now part of the sea wall, of a 70-ton Breton trading ketch. Williams-Ellis incorporates elements from the original boat.	Grade II
	Angel Gates (Hercules Gate)	c. 1937	Dated 1908 but erected opposite the Town Hall prior to the completion of that building.	Grade II
	Astrolabe	–	Metal astrolabe, on top of a Tuscan stone column set on a terracotta octagonal base.	Grade II
	Hercules Statue	1960 (cast c. 1863)	Statue by William Brodie, erected on a tall stone pedestal in the current site in 1960.	Grade II
	Monument in Battery Square	–	Statue of an eagle, on top of a stone ball finial, atop an iron column.	Grade II
	Wall adjoining Bridge House	early 1800s	A 19th century wall associated with the Aber Iâ mansion. The listed walling is visible both in the left of the picture, and in the centre-right (between the rock outcrop and the rear of Bridge House).	Grade II

== See also ==
- List of works by Clough Williams-Ellis
