= Sbardun =

Welsh musician and composer

Alun Huws (26 September 1948 – 15 December 2014), known professionally as Sbardun, was a Welsh musician and songwriter, known mainly for founding 1970s folk band Y Tebot Piws. He worked exclusively in Welsh and only gave one English language interview to the music press.

Sbardun was born in Caernarfonshire, Wales, and grew up in the village of Penrhyndeudraeth, where he formed a skiffle band with his brother. In 1968, when at college in Cardiff, he formed folk rock band Y Tebot Piws with three college friends, which was credited with beginning the 1970s rock scene in Wales. Y Tebot Piws was disbanded in 1972 and Sbardun joined folk band Ac Eraill, who composed the first Welsh language rock opera in 1974.

Y Tebot Piws reformed in 2002 and in 2008 released a collection of rock songs with a Celtic/Gaelic twist. They released a farewell album, Ta Ta Tebot, in 2011.

Sbardun died at the Heath Hospital in Cardiff on 15 December 2014.

A special edition of the Welsh language music programme, Y Stiwdio Gefn, was broadcast in December 2015, where a number of musicians performed music written by Sbardun. At the 2016 National Eisteddfod of Wales a new prize was to be awarded, with a trophy and £500 prize to be provided by Sbardun's widow, Gwenno Huws. The Sbardun Memorial Trophy competition and prize was to be for the best original folk song.
