= The Hotel Portmeirion =

Hotel in Portmeirion, Gwynedd, Wales

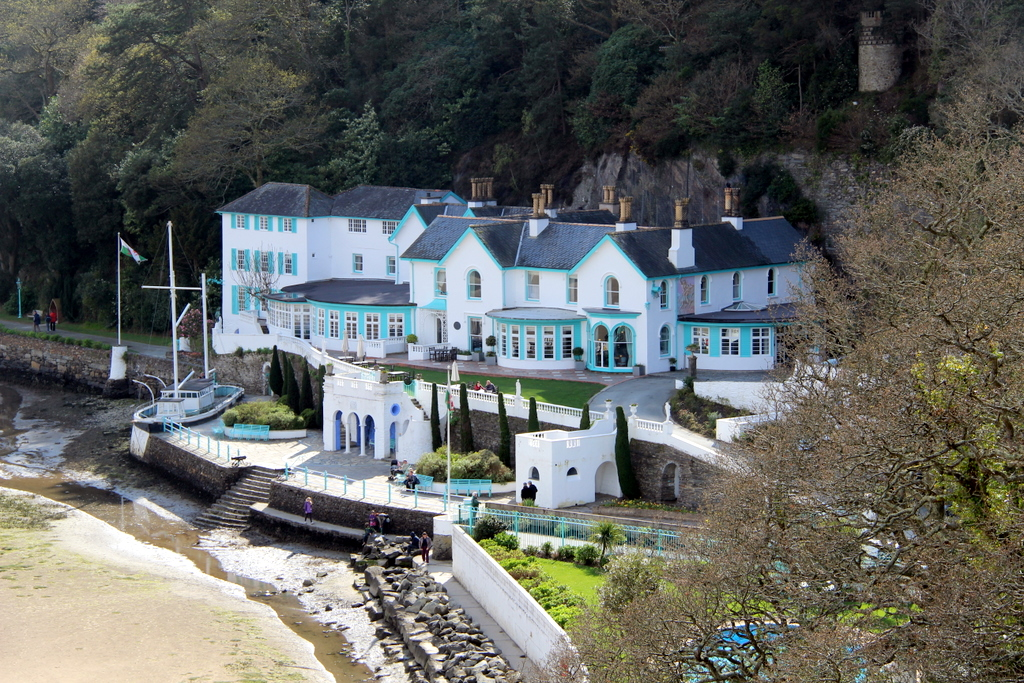
- Interactive map of the The Hotel Portmeirion area

General information
- Coordinates: 52.91211°N 4.09929°W
- Completed: circa 1850
- Renovated: 1926, 1988

The Hotel Portmeirion or sometimes Portmeirion Hotel (Welsh: Gwesty Portmeirion) is a hotel and restaurant in the village of Portmeirion, in Gwynedd, northwest Wales. The Hotel and many associated buildings and structures are Grade II listed buildings.

== Background ==
The hotel was originally a mansion called Aber Iâ and was built circa 1850. Architect Clough Williams-Ellis bought the Aber Iâ estate in 1925 as the location for his project to build an eccentric, eclectic village, which he accomplished between 1925 and 1975. Williams-Ellis needed to fund his project, he achieved this by developing the Aber Iâ villa as a luxury hotel, using other buildings in his village as restaurants or cottages to rent. The restored mansion was opened as a hotel in 1926, with the addition of a three-storey west wing. A dining room extension was added in 1930.

A terrace on the seafront was also built in 1926. In 1930 Williams-Ellis added a loggia ("Casino") as well as a recreation in concrete of a Breton boat, the Amis Reunis.

The hotel as well as the other village buildings became Grade II listed in 1971.

The hotel was gutted by fire in 1981 and re-opened in 1988 after being restored. An 18th-century staircase that had been incorporated in the original house was destroyed, as well as carved panels in the library, and the hotel bar which had been made from timbers from Britain's last active man-of-war ship, the HMS Arethusa.

In 2016 £1.5 million was spent installing a biomass heating system for the hotel and guest accommodation, which would save the hotel an estimated £100,000 a year on the fuel bills once it had recouped its costs.

== Reviews ==
According to a review by The Telegraph, the hotel itself has 14 rooms ("traditional") with an additional 32 ("cosy but quirky") in the nearby village. The reviewer scored the hotel between 8 and 9 out of 10.

In a 2016 review of the hotel restaurant, The Guardian compared the hotel as "equally lovely, and equally oddball" as the surrounding village, though was less complimentary about the food, saying it was "sad evidence of what happens when creativity is taken just that little bit too far".

== In popular culture ==
In the series The Prisoner, the hotel is depicted as the Old Peoples' Home in The Village.

== See also ==
- List of buildings and structures in Portmeirion
