= John Breese =

Welsh independent minister

John Breese (1789–1842) was a Welsh Independent minister. He attended the local chapel from a young age, and probably acquired most of his early education during Sunday School classes. He was admitted a full member of the church at the age of 20, before being invited to begin preaching at 24. Encouraged and helped by his friends he attended a school in Shrewsbury, before joining the Academy at Llanfyllin. His style of preaching was popular and attracted attention. He accepted an appointment at Edmund Street Church in Liverpool in 1817, before a move to the Tabernacle, Great Crosshall Street.

John married Margaret Williams (1801–1879) in 1823. The marriage produced six children. Margaret was the younger sister of Liberal MP for Merioneth, David Williams

His reputation as a preacher was far reaching, causing him to become quite famous throughout Wales. William Williams (1781–1840) and himself were the preachers most in demand at preaching assemblies.

Shortly after taking up an appointment at the Independent Chapel in Lammas Street, Carmarthen in 1835 his health began to fail. He died in Lammas Street on 8 August 1842 and was buried in the Chapel churchyard.
