= Portmeirion Town Hall =

Building in Portmeirion, Wales

- Neuadd y Dref Portmeirion (Welsh)
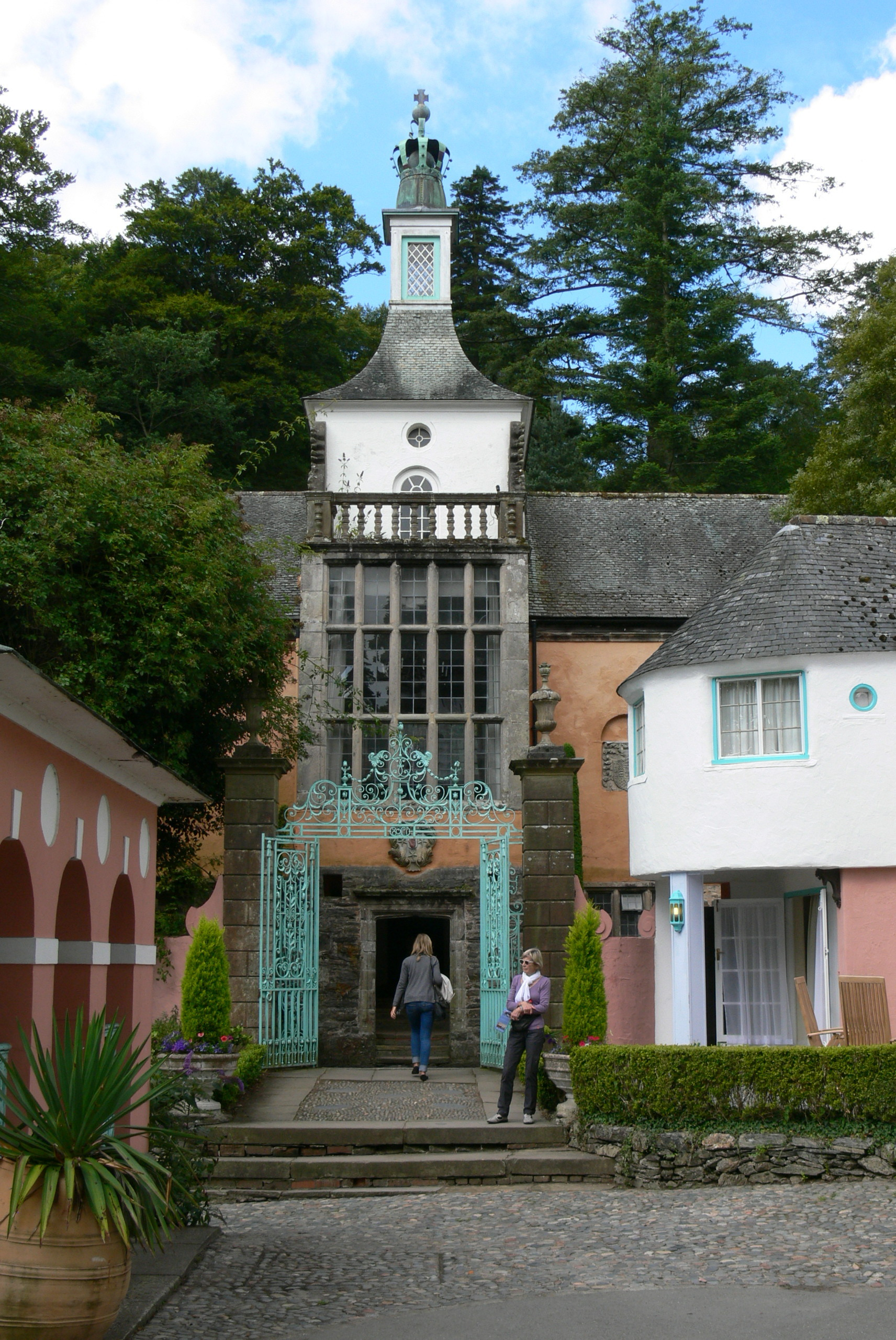
- Portmeirion Town Hall

- Shown in Gwynedd
- 52.9130°N 4.0997°W
- Location: Portmeirion

History
- Built: 1938

Site notes
- Architect: Sir Clough Williams-Ellis
- Architectural style: Jacobean style

Listed Building – Grade I
- Official name: Portmeirion Town Hall
- Designated: 28 April 1952
- Reference no.: 4777

Portmeirion Town Hall (Welsh: Neuadd y Dref Portmeirion), also known as the Hercules Hall, is a building in Portmeirion, Gwynedd, Wales. Being in a private village without a government, the building is used as an events venue. It is a Grade I listed building.

== History ==
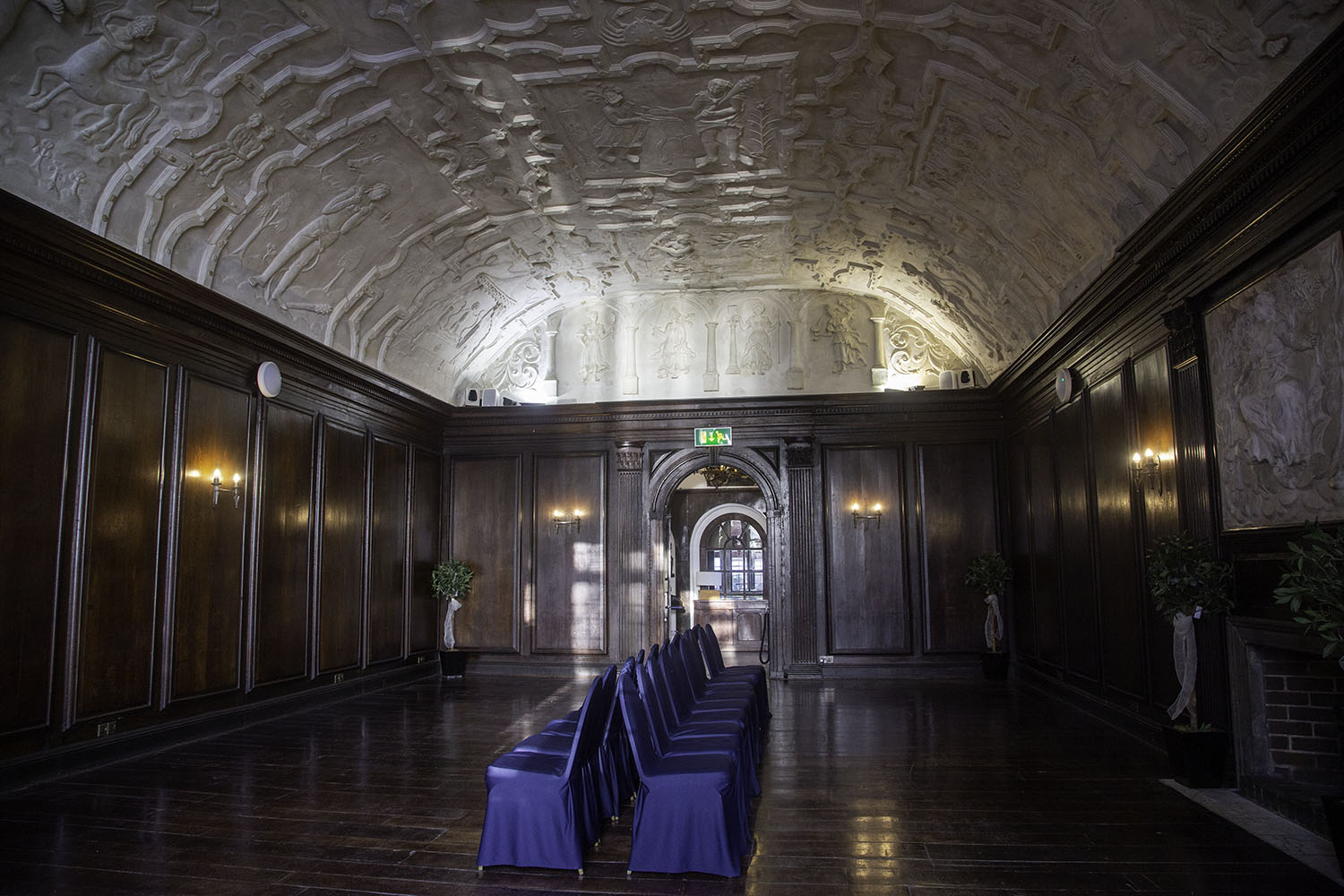
The Hercules Room

The town hall formed one of a series of buildings designed and commissioned by the architect, Sir Clough Williams-Ellis, on a site which had previously been known as Aber Iâ (English: Ice Estuary). He developed the site to create a Mediterranean-style village which he called "Portmeirion". The town hall was designed in the Jacobean style, built in rubble masonry on the ground floor and in brick with a stucco finish on the first floor, and was completed in 1938.

The design involved an asymmetrical main frontage with five bays facing east towards the centre of the village. The central bay, which projected forward, featured a three-stage tower with a doorway with a moulded architrave and a cornice on the ground floor, a large mullioned and transomed window on the first floor and a balcony with a round-headed French door and an oculus on the second floor, all surmounted by a steeply shaped roof with a lantern, coronet and ball. The coronet was created using an upturned pig boiler. The left hand end bay, which also projected forward, contained an archway with voussoirs on the ground floor and a mullioned and transomed window on the first floor, while the right hand end bay, which did not project forward, contained a mullioned window on the ground floor and a wrought iron balcony with a round headed French door on the first floor. Internally, the principal rooms were the main assembly room known as the "Hercules Hall" and a smaller reception room known as the "Tudor Room", both on the first floor.

Williams-Ellis created the Hercules Room by acquiring the ceiling from the banqueting hall at Emral Hall, near Maelor in Flintshire just before it was demolished in 1936. He managed to buy the ceiling cheaply for £13 at the pre-demolition auction, subsequently also buying the stone mullioned windows and fireplaces. The Emral estate had been established by the former member of parliament, Sir Roger Puleston, and rebuilt by his descendants in the early 18th century. The ceiling was barrel vaulted and depicted the labours of Hercules and the signs of the zodiac in white plaster cast. According the architectural historian, Nigel R. Jones, Williams-Ellis's work at Portmeirion, and his work on the town hall in particular, earned him a reputation in the architectural world for creating "a home for fallen buildings". A statue of Hercules, which had been sculpted by William Brodie in 1863, was relocated from Aberdeen to Portmeirion and erected near the town hall in 1960.

In 1967, the town hall was used as a filming location and also as the main production office for the British television series, The Prisoner, in which a British intelligence agent played by Patrick McGoohan and known as "Number Six" was imprisoned in a mysterious coastal village. Between 2012 and 2018, the town hall served as one of the main venues for the art and music festival, Festival N°6, the title of which recalled the number of the fictitious agent. Performers at the town hall included the singer, Charlotte Church, in 2016, the pop band Dutch Uncles in 2017, and the singer, Fenne Lily, in 2018.

== See also ==
- Grade I listed buildings in Gwynedd
- List of buildings and structures in Portmeirion
