= Scott baronets of the Yews (1909) =

The Scott baronetcy, of the Yews in the County of Westmorland, was created in the Baronetage of the United Kingdom on 27 July 1909 for the businessman James William Scott. His German merchant family was called Schott; by marriage he became head of the cotton spinners John Haslam & Co. of Lark Hill, Bolton.

The 3rd Baronet worked as a radiobiologist in cancer therapy research.

== Scott baronets, of the Yews (1909) ==
- Sir James William Scott, 1st Baronet (1844–1913)
- Sir Samuel Haslam Scott, 2nd Baronet (1875–1960)
- Sir Oliver Christopher Anderson Scott, 3rd Baronet (1922–2016)
- Sir Christopher James Anderson Scott, 4th Baronet (born 1955)

The heir apparent is the present holder's son Edward James Saim Scott (born 1990).

== Notes ==
Baronetage of the United Kingdom
Preceded by Nussey baronets	Scott baronets of the Yews; 27 July 1909	Succeeded by Williams baronets
