= Leonard Williams (physician) =

English physician & writer (1861–1939)

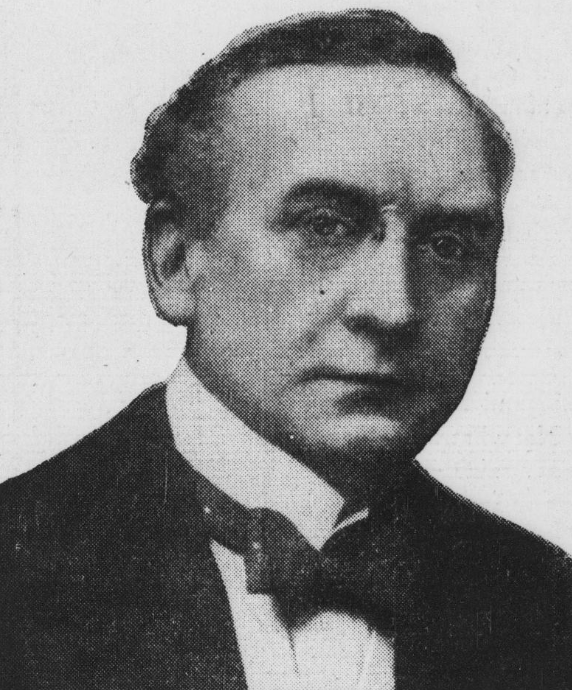
- Born: Leonard Llewelyn Bulkeley Williams; 2 October 1861; Castell Deudraeth, Merionethshire, Wales
- Died: 20 August 1939 (aged 77); London, England
- Occupations: Physician, writer
- Spouse: Antonia Beavan

Leonard Llewelyn Bulkeley Williams (2 October 1861 – 20 August 1939) was a Welsh physician and writer best known for his research on obesity and advocacy of a raw vegetarian diet.

== Biography ==
Williams was born in Castell Deudraeth, Merionethshire. He was educated at Marlborough College, University of Glasgow and in France and Germany. He received his MB in 1886 and MD from University of Glasgow in 1899. He trained at St Thomas' Hospital. He was elected to the visiting medical staff of Metropolitan Hospital, Miller General Hospital, the French Hospital and the German Hospital in London. He was an honorary medical officer for the Sidmouth Cottage Hospital and took the MRCP He worked as a general practitioner in Sidmouth and as a consultant physician in London. His father was David Williams. His book Minor Maladies and Their Treatment, published in 1913 was positively reviewed in medical journals.

He married Antonia Beavan. He was godfather to (and biological father of) Leonard Wilson Forster. Williams edited the Journal of Balneology and Climatology and the Medical Press and Circular. He was Vice-President of the British Balneological and Climatological Society and was the first President of the Balneological and Climatological section of the Royal Society of Medicine (RSM).

Williams was a prominent anti-suffragist. He was also a member of the Men's Dress Reform Party and Arbuthnot Lane's New Health Society. Williams died in London, aged 77.

== Health research ==
Williams was known for his research on obesity and glandular healing. Historian Ina Zweiniger-Bargielowska has noted that Williams "linked obesity with the petty comforts of sedentary suburban middle-class life or the rampant consumerism of new wealth." Williams was influenced by the research of Sir William Arbuthnot Lane. He attributed most diseases including cancer to autointoxication (defective operation of the alimentary canal) and slow poisoning from constipation. However, the autointoxication hypothesis was discredited in the 20th century as scientific studies failed to support it.

He recommended periodic fasting and open-air exercise. Williams was an early advocate of a raw fruit and vegetable diet. He warned people of the dangers of over-eating, butcher's meat and tobacco. He attributed many diseases to constipation and "intestinal toxaemia." His book The Science and Art of Living, was described in a review as a "slashing attack on meat-eaters, sweet-eaters and over-eaters". Williams argued against the use of the kitchen stove as it destroys certain vitamins. He argued that meat, sugars and starches should be replaced with fruit, raw vegetables and unsterilised dairy products. Williams was often cited as a fruitarian or vegetarian but he eschewed these labels. He stated that raw fruits and vegetables are essential to health and if they are not eaten then vitamin deficiencies emerge.

== Selected publications ==
- The Erect Posture (Good Health, 1921)
- Fasting (The Medical Standard, 1922)
- Minor Maladies and Their Treatment (1923)
- The Science and Art of Living (1924)
- Middle Age and Old Age (1925)
- Obesity (1926)
- Minor Medical Mysteries (1935)

== See also ==
- Raw foodism
