= David Williams (Liberal politician) =

Welsh Liberal Party politician (1799–1869)

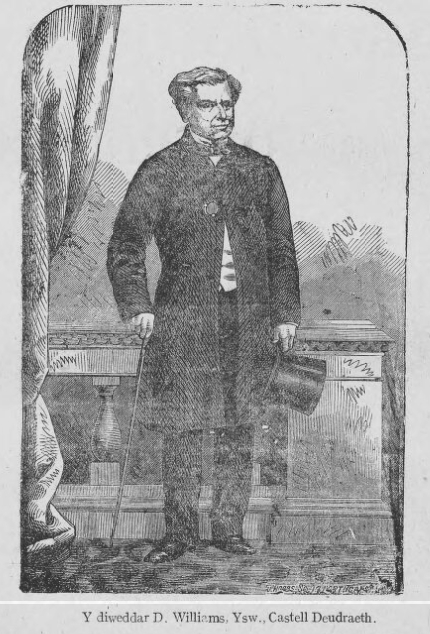
David Williams MP for Merionethshire – 8 January 1865

David Williams (30 June 1799 – 15 December 1869) was a Welsh Liberal Party politician who served for a short time as the Member of Parliament for the Merioneth constituency. Elected in 1868, he died in office the following year.

== Upbringing ==
The son of David Williams (1754–1823) and Jane Williams (née Jones; 1769–1834), he was born in the parish of Llanfihangel Bachellaeth, Caernarfonshire. His younger sister, Margaret (1801–1879), was married to the Welsh preacher John Breese. In 1841, he acquired Castell Deudraeth in Wales, which he later enlarged.

== Politics ==
He stood unsuccessfully as Liberal candidate for Merioneth in 1859 and 1865 before being elected in 1868.

Williams suffered from ill health throughout his time as MP and only attended the Commons to vote on one occasion, for the passing of the Irish Church Disestablishment Bill. Williams died in December 1869 and was succeeded, after a by-election, by Samuel Holland.

His second son Sir Osmond Williams also represented the seat from 1900 to 1910. His youngest son was the noted doctor, Leonard Llewelyn Bulkeley Williams (1861–1939), and his youngest daughter Alice Williams was a painter, bard and welfare worker.

Note* The Dictionary of Welsh Biography errs in citing a Margaret Williams as David's mother. Jane Jones is generally recognized as David's mother.

== Sources ==
=== Books and journals ===
- Jones, Ieuan Gwynedd (1981). Explorations and Explanations. Essays in the Social History of Victorian Wales. Llandysul: Gomer. ISBN 0850886449.

Parliament of the United Kingdom
Preceded by William Robert Maurice Wynne	Member of Parliament for Merioneth; 1868–1869	Succeeded by Samuel Holland
