= Castell Deudraeth =

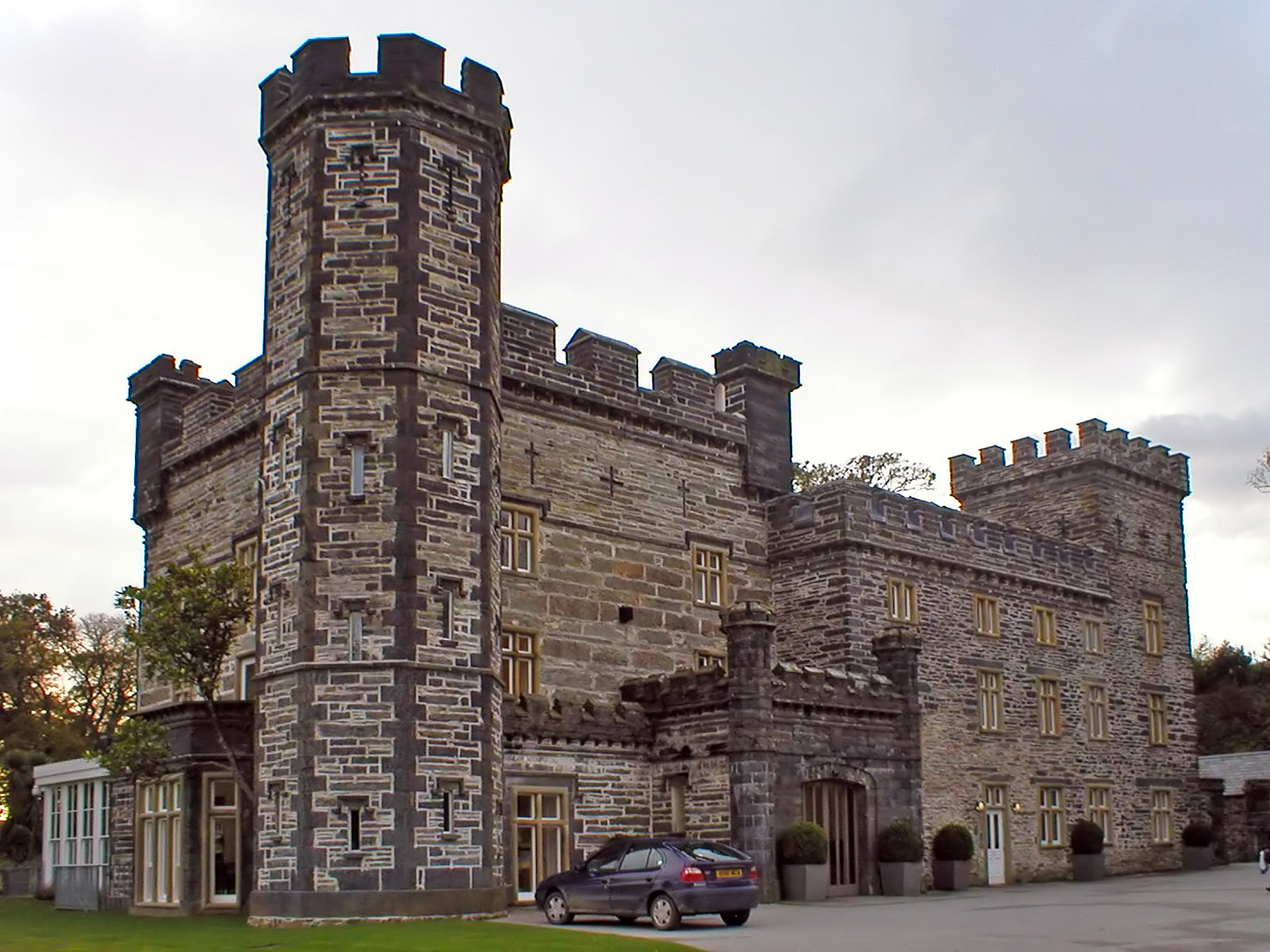
- Castell Deudraeth in 2007

- Location within Gwynedd
- 52.9184°N 4.0952°W
- Type: Hotel
- Location: Portmeirion, Gwynedd

Listed Building – Grade II*
- Official name: Castell Deudraeth
- Designated: 30 November 1966
- Reference no.: 4841

Castell Deudraeth is a former manor house approximately 0.5 km NE of Portmeirion in Gwynedd, North Wales.

== History ==
The name is taken from a former late 12th century castle, now lost.

The current house, which possibly dates from the 18th century, was enlarged in the 19th century to be a sizable manor house. At this stage it was known as Bron Eryn. In 1841 it was bought by David Williams, who enlarged and castellated it in the 1840s and 1850s. He also renamed it Castell Deudraeth. Sir Clough Williams-Ellis bought the house and its parkland from the trustees of his uncle-in-law, Sir Osmond Williams, who died in 1931.

He had planned to incorporate the house into Portmeirion village, as extra accommodation for hotel guests, but this was not achieved in his lifetime. It was not until 2001, after the Portmeirion Foundation had undertaken a major restoration programme, that the house was reopened.

== See also ==
- List of buildings and structures in Portmeirion
