= List of UK Parliament constituencies in Gwynedd =

Three constituencies cover the preserved county of Gwynedd for the House of Commons of the UK Parliament, and are used also for elections to the Senedd. The current boundaries have been effective since the 2007 National Assembly for Wales election and the 2010 United Kingdom general election. (Note: county constituencies (CCs) for the purposes of type of returning officer and level of expenses; the trivial distinction is sometimes made in the most detailed analyses of UK politics between borough and county constituencies).

The preserved county of Gwynedd, covers the principal area (county) of Gwynedd, as well as the principal area of Anglesey (Welsh: Ynys Môn).

For Senedd elections, the constituencies each elect one assembly member and are grouped into additional-member electoral regions, in this instance the region is North Wales.

== Westminster boundaries ==
=== From 2010 ===
| Constituency | Boundaries |
|---|---|
| 1. Arfon CC (Westminster) | Parliamentary constituencies in Gwynedd 2010 |
| 2. Dwyfor Meirionnydd CC (Westminster) | Parliamentary constituencies in Gwynedd 2010 |
| 3. Ynys Môn CC (Westminster) | Parliamentary constituencies in Gwynedd 2010 |

Plaid Cymru ₪ Conservative † Labour ‡

| Constituency | Electorate | Majority | Member of Parliament | Nearest opposition | Map reference above |
|---|---|---|---|---|---|
| Arfon | 42,215 | 2,781 | Hywel Williams ₪ | Steffie Williams Roberts ‡ | 1 |
| Dwyfor Meirionnydd | 44,362 | 4,740 | Liz Saville Roberts ₪ | Tomos Davies † | 2 |
| Ynys Môn | 51,925 | 1,968 | Virginia Crosbie † | Mary Roberts ‡ | 3 |

=== 1997 to 2010 ===
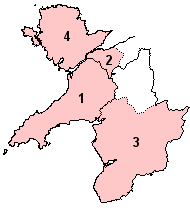
| Constituency | Boundaries |
|---|---|
| 1. Caernarfon CC (Westminster) | Parliamentary constituencies in Gwynedd pre-2010 |
| 2. Conwy CC (Westminster) (part) | Parliamentary constituencies in Gwynedd pre-2010 |
| 3. Meirionnydd Nant Conwy CC (Westminster) (part) | Parliamentary constituencies in Gwynedd pre-2010 |
| 4. Ynys Môn CC (Westminster) | Parliamentary constituencies in Gwynedd pre-2010 |

== Proposed boundary changes ==
The Boundary Commission for Wales submitted their final proposals in respect of the Sixth Periodic Review of Westminster Constituencies (the 2018 review) in September 2018. Although the proposals were immediately laid before Parliament they were not brought forward by the Government for approval. Accordingly, they did not come into effect for the 2019 election which took place on 12 December 2019, and which was contested using the constituency boundaries in place since 2010.

Under the terms of the Parliamentary Voting System and Constituencies Act 2011, the Sixth Review was based on reducing the total number of MPs from 650 to 600 and a strict electoral parity requirement that the electorate of all constituencies should be within a range of 5% either side of the electoral quota.

On 24 March 2020, the Minister of State for the Cabinet Office, Chloe Smith, issued a written statement to Parliament setting out the Government's thinking with regard to parliamentary boundaries. They propose to bring forward primary legislation to remove the statutory obligation to implement the 2018 Boundary Review recommendations, as well as set the framework for future boundary reviews in time for the next review which is due to begin in early 2021 and report no later than October 2023. It is proposed that the number of constituencies now remains at the current level of 650, rather than being reduced to 600, while retaining the requirement that the electorate should be no more than +/- 5% from the electoral quota.

== Senedd boundaries ==
=== From 2007 ===
| Constituency | Senedd region | Constituency boundaries |
|---|---|---|
| 1. Arfon CC (Senedd) | North Wales | Senedd constituencies in Gwynedd 2007 |
| 2. Dwyfor Meirionnydd CC (Senedd) | Mid and West Wales | Senedd constituencies in Gwynedd 2007 |
| 3. Ynys Môn CC (Senedd) | North Wales | Senedd constituencies in Gwynedd 2007 |

The North Wales region also includes seven Clwyd constituencies. The Mid and West Wales region also includes five Dyfed constituencies and two Powys constituencies.

=== 1999 to 2007 ===
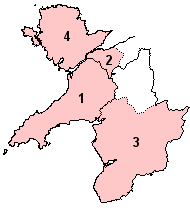
| Constituency | Assembly region | Constituency boundaries |
|---|---|---|
| 1. Caernarfon CC (Assembly) | North Wales | Assembly constituencies in Gwynedd pre-2007 |
| 2. Conwy CC (Assembly) (part) | North Wales | Assembly constituencies in Gwynedd pre-2007 |
| 3. Meirionnydd Nant Conwy CC (Assembly) (part) | Mid and West Wales | Assembly constituencies in Gwynedd pre-2007 |
| 4. Ynys Môn CC (Assembly) | North Wales | Assembly constituencies in Gwynedd pre-2007 |

== Historical representation by party ==
Before 1974/1983 this table covers the historic counties of Anglesey, Carnarvonshire and Merionethshire. A cell marked → (with a different colour background to the preceding cell) indicates that the previous MP continued to sit under a new party name.

=== 1832 to 1885 ===
Conservative Liberal Peelite Whig

| Constituency | 1832 | 33 | 33 | 1835 | 36 | 1837 | 1841 | 46 | 1847 | 1852 | 1857 |
|---|---|---|---|---|---|---|---|---|---|---|---|
| Anglesey | Williams-Bulkeley | | | | | Stanley | | | Williams-Bulkeley | | |
| Beaumaris | F. Paget | | | | | | | | G. Paget | | Stanley |
| Caernarvon | C. Paget | Nanney | C. Paget | L. Jones-Parry | | Hughes | | → | | | |
| Caernarvonshire | Smith | | | | | Ormsby-Gore | E. Douglas-Pennant | | | | |
| Merionethshire | Vaughan | | | | Richards | | | | | W. W. Wynne | |

=== 1859 to 1885 ===
Conservative Liberal

| Constituency | 1859 | 1865 | 66 | 1868 | 70 | 1874 | 1880 | 80 | 82 |
|---|---|---|---|---|---|---|---|---|---|
| Anglesey | Williams-Bulkeley | | | Davies | | | | | |
| Beaumaris | Stanley | | | | | Lloyd | | | |
| Caernarvon | C. Wynne | Hughes | | | | | | | T. Jones-Parry |
| Caernarvonshire | E. Douglas-Pennant | | G. Douglas-Pennant | T. Jones-Parry | | G. Douglas-Pennant | C. Williams | Rathbone | |
| Merionethshire | W. W. Wynne | W. R. Wynne | | D. Williams | Holland | | | | |

=== 1885 to 1918 ===
Conservative Liberal

| Constituency | 1885 | 1886 | 90 | 1892 | 1895 | 99 | 00 | 06 | 06 | Jan 10 | Dec 10 | 15 |
|---|---|---|---|---|---|---|---|---|---|---|---|---|
| Anglesey | R. Davies | Lewis | | | Ellis-Griffith | | | | | | | |
| Arfon | Rathbone | | | | W. Jones | | | | | | | Rees |
| Carnarvon | Jones-Parry | Swetenham | D. Lloyd George | | | | | | | | | |
| Merionethshire | Robertson | Ellis | | | | Edwards | Williams | | | Haydn Jones | | |
| Eifion | J. Roberts | | | | | | | | E. Davies | | | |

=== 1918 to 1950 ===
Coalition Liberal (1918–22) / National Liberal (1922–23) Conservative Independent Labour Independent Liberals Labour Liberal

| Constituency | 1918 | 1922 | 23 | 1923 | 24 | 1929 | 1931 | 1935 | 45 | 1945 |
|---|---|---|---|---|---|---|---|---|---|---|
| Anglesey | O. Thomas | | R. Thomas | | | M. Lloyd George | → | → | | |
| Carnarvon | → | | | → | | | → | → | S. Davies | Price-White |
| Carnarvonshire | Breese | R. Jones | | Owen | | | → | → | | G. Roberts |
| Merionethshire | Haydn Jones | | | | | | | | | E. Roberts |

=== 1950 to 1983 ===
Conservative Labour Liberal Plaid Cymru

| Constituency | 1950 | 1951 | 1955 | 1959 | 1964 | 1966 | 1970 | Feb 1974 | Oct 1974 | 1979 |
|---|---|---|---|---|---|---|---|---|---|---|
| Anglesey | Lloyd George | Hughes | | | | | | | | Best |
| Caernarfon | G. Roberts | | | | | | | Wigley | | |
| Merionethshire | E. Roberts | T. Jones | | | | Edwards | | Thomas | | |
| Conway^{1} | W. Jones | Thomas | | | | Davies | W. Roberts | | | |

=== 1983 to 2010 ===
Conservative Labour Plaid Cymru

| Constituency | 1983 | 1987 | 1992 | 1997 | 2001 | 2005 |
|---|---|---|---|---|---|---|
| Ynys Môn | Best | Wyn Jones | | | Owen | |
| Caernarfon | Wigley | | | | H. Williams | |
| Meirionnydd Nant Conwy | Thomas | | Llwyd | | | |
| Conway^{1} | W. Roberts | | | B. Williams | | |

^{1}In 2003 the area of the former Aberconwy district, largely identical to the Conway constituency, was moved from the preserved county of Gwynedd to the preserved county of Clwyd. This constituency is graphed with the Gwynedd constituencies until the reorganisation of constituency boundaries in 2010.

=== 2010 to present ===
Conservative Labour Plaid Cymru

| Constituency | 2010 | 2015 | 2017 | 2019 | 2024 |
|---|---|---|---|---|---|
| Ynys Môn | Owen | | | Crosbie | Medi |
| Arfon^{1} | H. Williams | | | | N/A |
| Dwyfor Meirionnydd | Llwyd | Saville Roberts | | | |

^{1}parts transferred in 2024 to the constituency of Bangor Aberconwy which lies mostly in Clwyd

== See also ==
- List of parliamentary constituencies in Wales
