= Cymru Fydd =

Welsh nationalist movement

The Cymru Fydd (Welsh pronunciation: [ˈkəmrɨ ˈvɨːð]; "The Wales to Come") movement was founded in 1886 by some of the London and Liverpool Welsh. Some of its main leaders included David Lloyd George (later Prime Minister), J. E. Lloyd, O. M. Edwards, T. E. Ellis (leader, MP for Merioneth, 1886–1899), Beriah Gwynfe Evans and Alfred Thomas. Initially it was a purely London-based society, later expanding to cities in England with a large Welsh population.

The founders of Cymru Fydd were influenced by William Ewart Gladstone, who himself lived in Hawarden, Wales, and the nationalist movement in Ireland, although the movement also drew upon other ideas, including a sense of imperial mission as preached by John Ruskin and a programme of social and political reform promoted by Robert Owen, Arnold Toynbee and the Fabian Society. This was therefore in stark contrast to Irish Nationalism, under Charles Stewart Parnell and others, which sought separation from British political structures. The movement resembled the cultural nationalism found in parts of continental Europe, and heavily influenced by members of the intelligentsia such as O. M. Edwards and J. E. Lloyd.

From 1892 branches were organised in Wales itself, the first being formed at Barry by W. Llewelyn Williams.

Its main objective was to gain self-government for Wales. The movement lost some of its impetus following the withdrawal of T. E. Ellis to join the Government in 1892, after which the leadership of Cymru Fydd was taken over by David Lloyd George and Herbert Lewis (MP for Flint Boroughs). Cymru Fydd was re-launched on a narrower, more political basis.

After an initial period of success in 1894–95, in which time it merged with the North Wales Liberal Federation (18 April 1895) to form the Welsh National Federation, it met with fierce opposition from the South Wales Liberal Federation, led by the Federation President, David Alfred Thomas (MP for Merthyr Tydfil 1889–1910).

On 16 January 1896, the proposal to merge the South Wales Liberal Federation with the Welsh National Federation was put to the Annual General Meeting (AGM) of the South Wales Liberal Federation, held at Newport, Monmouthshire. Lloyd George was howled down and refused permission to speak. After Robert Bird, a senior Cardiff alderman, declared his determination to resist "the domination of Welsh ideas", the merger proposal was defeated. Cymru Fydd collapsed soon afterwards. The effect of this collapse was particularly severe on the Women's Liberal Associations, all but 15 of which collapsed. Lloyd George switched his attention to British matters, next coming to prominence as an opponent of the Boer War.

The movement was supported by the magazine Young Wales, edited by John Hugh Edwards between 1895 and its collapse in 1896. An earlier magazine, Cymru Fydd, ceased publication in 1891.

== Sources ==
- Morgan, Kenneth O. (1981). Rebirth of a Nation. Wales 1889–1980. Oxford: Oxford University Press. ISBN 0-19-821760-9.
- Morgan, Kenneth O. (1991). Wales in British Politics 1868–1922 (3rd ed.). Cardiff: University of Wales Press. ISBN 0708311245.
