= Roger Pope =

Roger Pope (died 1647) was an English politician who sat in the House of Commons in 1647. He fought in the Parliamentary army in the English Civil War.

== Personal life ==
Pope was possibly the son of Thomas Pope of Shrewsbury and his wife Luciad Edwards, daughter of Thomas Edwards of Shrewsbury.

Pope married a daughter of Thomas Mytton.

== Career ==
He fought in the Parliamentarian army in the Civil War, assisting General Thomas Mytton in North Wales. In 1646 he was a colonel and was appointed governor of Holt Castle after its capture in January 1647.

In 1647, Pope was elected Member of Parliament for Merioneth in the Long Parliament.

== Death ==
He died a few months after being elected Member of Parliament.

Parliament of England
Preceded by William Price	Member of Parliament for Merioneth; 1647	Succeeded by John Jones
