= Robert Lloyd (of Rhiwgoch) =

Member of the Parliament of England

Robert Lloyd was a Welsh politician who sat in the House of Commons in 1586 and 1601.

Lloyd was the son of Evan Lloyd of Rhiwgoch and his wife Elen Salusbury, daughter of Robert Salusbury of Llanrwst, Denbighshire. He was possibly educated at Shrewsbury School in 1574. In 1586, he was elected Member of Parliament for Merioneth. He was at this time escheator for Merioneth. He was High Sheriff of Merionethshire in 1596 and Deputy Lieutenant in 1600. In 1601 he was elected MP for Merioneth again. During this time he was unpopular with people of influence, in particular the Earl of Pembroke, and was subject to various allegations about his conduct. He was High Sheriff of Merionethshire in 1602. In 1610 he rebuilt his house at Rhiwgoch. He was High Sheriff of Merioneth again in 1615 and in 1625.

Lloyd took out a pardon at the coronation of Charles I, but was written off as ‘very old’ when being considered for another term as Sheriff in the 1630s.

Lloyd married Margaret Nanney, daughter of Hugh Nanney of Nannau, Dolgelly and had four sons and five daughters. His son Ellis was also MP for Merioneth.

Parliament of England
Preceded by Cadwaladr Price	Member of Parliament for Merioneth; 1586	Succeeded by Robert Salusbury
Preceded by Thomas Myddelton; John Vaughan	Member of Parliament for Merioneth; 1601	Succeeded by Edward Herbert
