= William Salesbury (of Rhug) =

English politician

William Salusbury (1580–1660) was a Welsh privateer in the East Indies, poet and politician who sat in the House of Commons from 1621 to 1622. He was governor of Denbigh Castle, fought on the Royalist side in the English Civil War and held out for over six months until the final days of the war, only surrendering on the written instruction of Charles I.

== Life ==
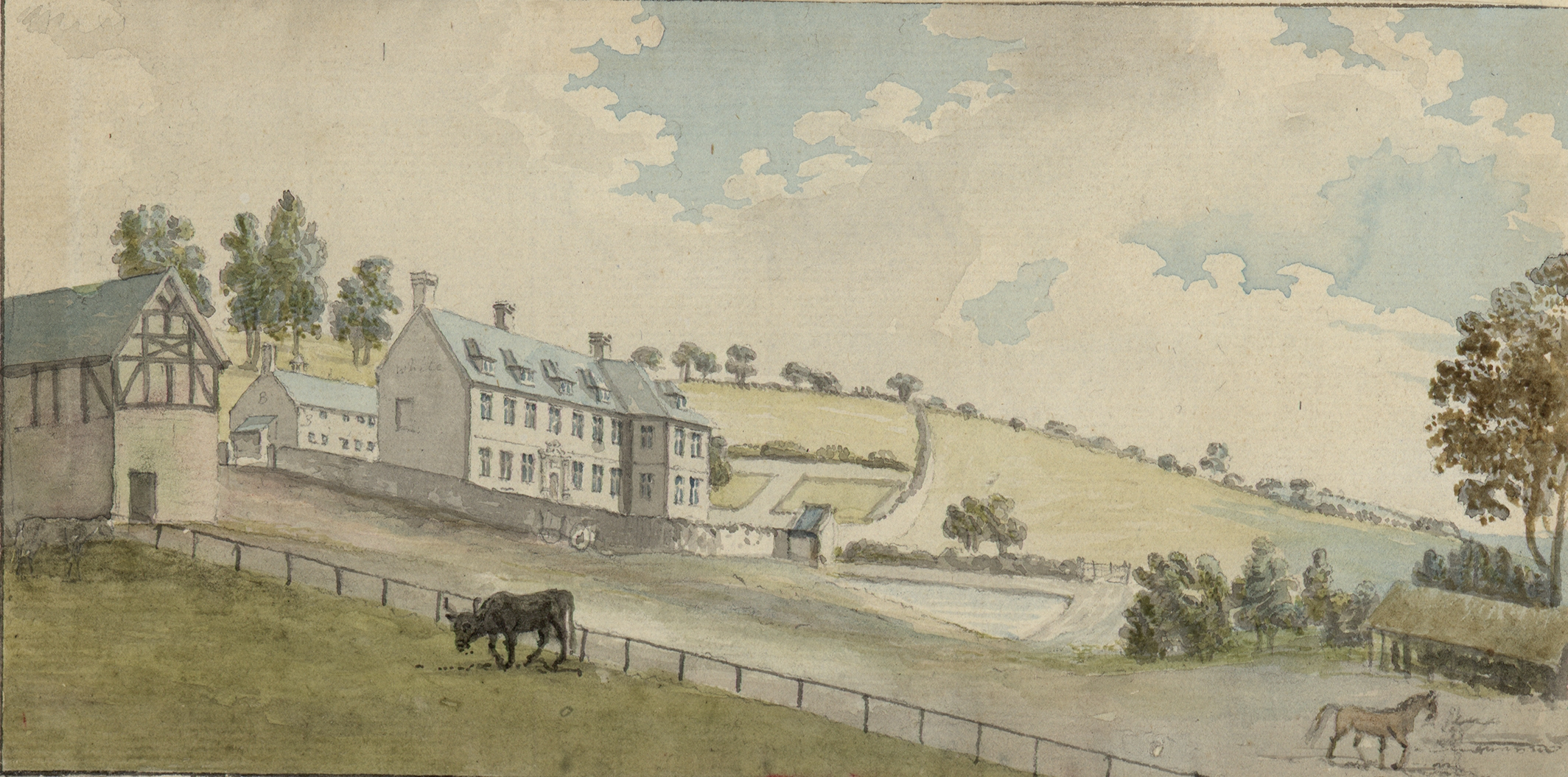
Bachymbyd, Llanynys

William Salusbury was born in 1580 in a house near Denbigh, North Wales, son of John Salusbury and Eisabeth Salusbury (his namesake and the daughter of Sir John Salusbury of Lleweni) brother of Sir Robert Salesbury MP for Denbighshire and John. The family motto was A vynno Dew dervid (What God wills will come to pass) and their surname was variously spelt Salusbury, Salsberie or Salesbury.

Early in the 1600s, Salusbury served on board the sailing vessel, the Barque Wylloby in the East Indies.

On 19 October 1599, Salusbury was registered for matriculation at Oriel College, Oxford.

When Sir Robert died in 1599, the estates passed to his son John Salusbury, who died in 1608. Without any children, the estate reverted to his uncle John and when he died in 1611, the estates were passed to William.

On 10 December 1611, articles of agreement were drawn up for Salusbury to marry Dorothy Vaughan, eldest daughter of Owen Vaughan of Lloydiarth.

Extensive debts had been created from mortgages accumulated under Sir Robert and his son over the previous thirty years. On 15 May 1613, Salesbury took Pierce Griffith, Elen Owen and others to the chancery court to gain access to the lands left to him after exposing that Elen Owen had "insinuated herself into familiarity with him (Uncle John Salesbury) by offer to be a nurse" .... "to make a prey to herself and her accomplices of the whole estate of money, land and goods of the said John Salisburye" and leases to the estate had been obtained by "fraud and deceit". The court instructed that the debt bonds held by Pierce Griffith were to be brought to court and given to Salesbury by 20 June 1613.

By frugal living, Salusbury succeeded in paying off all the debts and creating an inheritance. However, when his eldest son married Mary, daughter of Gabriel Goodman of Abenbury, prothonotary of North Wales, a fierce quarrel drove Salysbury to split the family estate into two halves. Owen would receive Rug and the Merionethshire lands, and Bachymbyd and the Denbighshire lands would be left to his second son, Charles.

== Parliament ==
In 1621, he was elected Member of Parliament for Merioneth under James I.

== Rug Chapel ==
In 1637, Colonel Salusbury built Rug Chapel, with a plain exterior and a richly ornate interior of intense carvings and decoration.

== Royalist ==
In 1643, a year after the start of the Civil War, William fortified Denbigh Castle out of his own money. As a staunch Royalist, he supported Charles I, became a colonel in the Royalist army during the Civil War and was appointed governor of Denbigh Castle, which he repaired at his own expense. With a garrison of 500 men, the castle was virtually impregnable without a large attacking army.

In 1645, the king, accompanied by 500 cavalry, arrived at Denbigh straight from the decisive defeat at Rowton Heath near Chester through the Burgess Gates of Denbigh on 25 September in early evening. The governor welcomed the king and they spent around two hours in private. Such was the frank advice given by Salusbury that the king was later to remark, "Never did a Prince hear so much truth at once". The king was housed in the Kitchen Tower for three days, before leaving for Cyffylliog to rendezvous with the remnants of his army and cavalry. The king continued on to Ruthin before leaving Wales for the last time.

With the castle under siege from parliamentary forces, Salusbury held out for six months and refused to surrender on five occasions. Both the castle and the surrounding town walls were secure in spite of cannon fire being used to try to destroy the Goblin Tower on the east side of the town walls, which was reputedly a source of water for the defenders. On the south west corner, further cannon fire sought to breach the thinner outer curtain wall, the mantlet. In response, the castle had one cannon to try to return fire. Nevertheless, the large castle was never breached. Finally, on 26 October 1646, Salusbury agreed to surrender to General Mytton, but only after receiving a letter from the king instructing him to agree terms. The Royalists marched out of the castle after being granted the "honours of war" by General Mytton with the musketeers' matches lit at both ends.

On the eve of the king's execution in 1649, Charles sent Salusbury an embroidered cap of crimson silk as a token of his respect. For the duration of The Protectorate, William was heavily fined for his commitment and loyalty to the Royalist cause.

Upon the restoration of Charles II, in 1660, Salesbury was nominated for the order of Knight of the Royal Oak, having an estate of £800 a year. He was known affectionately as Hen Hosanau Gleision ("old blue stockings") and was described as "an upright honourable man".

== Death ==
William Salusbury died at the age of 80 years in 1660 and was buried near Llanynys, near Denbigh.

Parliament of England
Preceded by Ellis Lloyd	Member of Parliament for Merioneth; 1621–1622	Succeeded by Henry Wynn
