= 1870 Merionethshire by-election =

UK parliamentary by-election in Wales

The 1870 Merionethshire by-election was a parliamentary by-election held for the UK House of Commons constituency of Merionethshire in North Wales on 17 January 1870.

== Vacancy ==
The by-election was caused by the death of the sitting Liberal MP, David Williams.

== Candidates ==
Two candidates were nominated.

The Liberal Party nominated former High Sheriff of Merionethshire Samuel Smith.

The Conservative Party nominated Charles John Tottenham, an Honorary Colonel in the Denbighshire Yeomanry Cavalry.

== Result ==
1870 Merionethshire by-election
Party	Candidate	Votes	%	±%
Liberal	Samuel Holland	1,610	62.6	N/A
Conservative	Charles John Tottenham	963	37.4	N/A
Majority		647	25.2	N/A
Turnout		2,573	80.7	N/A
Registered electors		3,187		
Liberal hold		Swing	N/A	
