= Llanfor =

Coordinates: 52.916°N 3.583°W

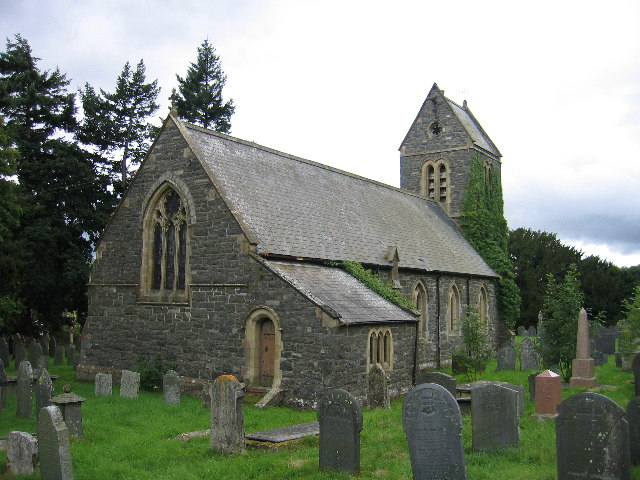
- Llanfor Church

- Location within Gwynedd
- OS grid reference: SH935366
- Community: Llandderfel
- Principal area: Gwynedd
- Country: Wales
- Sovereign state: United Kingdom
- Post town: BALA
- Postcode district: LL23
- Dialling code: 01678
- Police: North Wales
- Fire: North Wales
- Ambulance: Welsh
- UK Parliament: Dwyfor Meirionnydd
- Senedd Cymru – Welsh Parliament: Dwyfor Meirionnydd

Llanfor is a village in Gwynedd, Wales near the town of Bala, in the community of Llandderfel.

== History ==
There is evidence of an Iron Age hill fort in the immediate area. There was a Roman fort, so far undated precisely but it may have been built during the first campaign of conquest of Wales by the Roman governor Julius Frontinus (AD 73-77).

In the 6th century an unknown monk from Llanfor was reputedly responsible for converting Llywarch Hen, prince of Rheged, to Christianity.

There is a legend that the Devil used to frequently visit Llanfor Church in the shape of a pig.

== Notable people from Llanfor ==
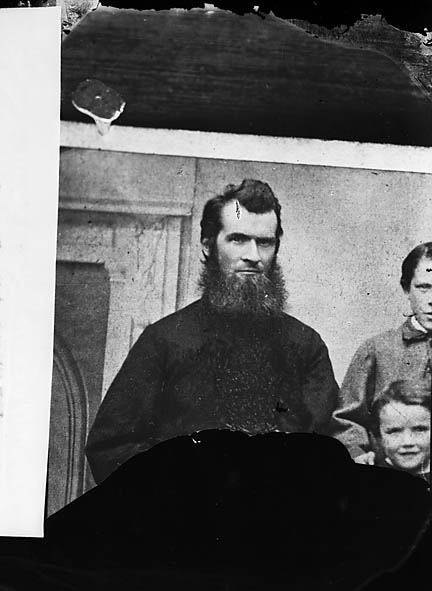
Dewi Havhesp, ca.1875

- William Price (1619–1691), a Welsh politician, MP between 1640 and 1679 and fought as a Royalist colonel in the English Civil War.
- Humphrey Foulkes (1673–1737) a Welsh priest and antiquarian.
- William Price (1690–1774) a Welsh High Sheriff and antiquarian, from Rhiwlas.
- Richard Thelwall Price, British member of Parliament for Beaumaris, 1754–1768
- John Williams (1811–1862), antiquary, bardic name Ab Ithel, the Anglican curate of Llanfor from 1835
- Richard Williams Morgan (1815–1889), bardic name Môr Meirion, author, priest and Welsh nationalist campaigner
- David Roberts (1831–1884), poet known as ‘Dewi Havhesp’, spent his early years at 'Pensingrug', Llanfor.
