= Lewis Owen (Merioneth MP, died 1692) =

Welsh politician

Lewis Owen (1622 – 22 January 1692) was a Welsh politician who sat in the House of Commons in 1659.

Owen was the son of Richard Owen of Morben and Melenceth Merionethshire and his wife Margaret Owen daughter of Lewis Owen of Peniarth. He matriculated at The Queen's College, Oxford on 17 March 1637 aged 15 and was admitted to Inner Temple in November 1640. He was a Royalist in the Civil War and was captured in his bed at Peniarth by Colonel John Jones of Nanteos on 8 December 1645 and taken prisoner to Cardiganshire. In spite of this he was High Sheriff of Merionethshire in 1647.

In 1659, Owen was elected Member of Parliament for Merioneth for the Third Protectorate Parliament.

At the Restoration, Owen was nominated Knight of the Royal Oak having an estate of £600 per year.

Owen of Peniarth died in the year of his 70th birthday.

Parliament of England
| Preceded by John Jones | Member of Parliament for Merioneth; 1659 | Succeeded by Not represented in Restored Rump |
