= Edmund Meyricke =

Edmund Meyricke may refer to:

- Edmund Meyrick (1636–1713), Welsh cleric and benefactor of Jesus College, Oxford
- Edmund Meyricke (MP) (died 1666), Welsh politician
