= Ben Jones (Welsh solicitor) =

Welsh solicitor (1914–1989)

Benjamin George Jones CBE (18 November 1914 – 3 April 1989), was a Welsh Solicitor and Liberal Party politician. He was a partner at Linklaters & Paines, Solicitors.

== Background ==
Jones was born the son of Thomas Jones. He was educated at Aberaeron County School and University College of Wales, Aberystwyth. In 1946 he married Menna Wynn-Jones. They had one son and one daughter. He was appointed a CBE in 1979.

== Political career ==
Jones was Liberal candidate for the Merioneth division at the 1959 General Election. He did not stand for parliament again. He was chairman of the London Welsh Association. He was chairman of the Welsh Book Club in London. He was chairman of the Council for the Welsh Language, 1973–78.

=== Electoral record ===
General Election 1959: Merioneth
Party	Candidate	Votes	%	±%
Labour	Thomas Jones	9,095	40.7	+2.4
Liberal	Ben Jones	8,119	36.3	+9.4
Plaid Cymru	Gwynfor Evans	5,127	23.0	+0.9
Majority		976	4.4	−6.9
Turnout		22,341		
Labour hold		Swing	-3.5	
