= Edmund Meyricke (MP) =

Member of the Parliament of England

Edmund Meyricke (died 1666) was a Welsh politician who sat in the House of Commons of England in 1660.

Meyricke was the eldest son of Peter Meyricke of Ucheldre, Gwyddelwern, Merioneth and his wife Lowri Anwyl, daughter of Lewis Anwyl of Parc, Llanfrothen. He succeeded to the estates on the death of his father in 1630 and became a J.P. in the same year. He was Sheriff of Merioneth from 1632 to 1633. He tried to avoid any part in the Civil War and though called to execute a Commission of Array in 1642, he failed to act. He was commissioner for assessment from 1647 to 1649, in 1652, in 1657, and from January 1660 until his death. In 1660, he was elected Member of Parliament for Merioneth in the Convention Parliament. He was Deputy Lieutenant from August 1660 and was restored to the commission of peace in September 1660.

Meyricke died in 1666 and was buried at Gwyddelwern on 9 November 1666.

Meyricke married Grace Watkin daughter of Cadwaladr ap Watkin of Garthllwyd, Llanderfel on 5 February 1619. They had two sons and three daughters. Grace died in August 1629 and he married secondly by 1636, Janet Oliver, widow of Thomas Oliver of Bala and daughter of John Vaughan of Cefnbodig, Llanycil. They had one son.

Parliament of England
Preceded by Not represented in Restored Rump	Member of Parliament for Merioneth; 1660	Succeeded by Henry Wynn
