= William Price (High Sheriff) =

William Price (1690 – 4 July 1774) was a Welsh High Sheriff and antiquarian.

Price was a member of the Price family from Rhiwlas, in the parish of Llanfor, near Bala, Wales. He was the grandson of William Price, a Member of Parliament and Royalist colonel during the English Civil War. Price was educated at Jesus College, Oxford, matriculating there in 1707. He left Oxford University without taking a degree.

He served as High Sheriff of Merionethshire from 1730 to 1731, and High Sheriff of Caernarvonshire (a county where he owned extensive property) from 1731 to 1732. He was an antiquarian: letters from him about antiquarian remains and the Bala eisteddfod of 1747 are held by the British Museum. Five bards composed englynion in his honour at an eisteddfod in Bala in 1738.

He was probably the William Price of "Rhulace" who was elected a Fellow of the Royal Society in 1752 and who resigned in 1771.

He died on 4 July 1774. He had married twice: firstly Mary, daughter of Price Devereux, 9th Viscount Hereford and secondly Elizabeth, daughter of Richard Bulkeley, Viscount Bulkeley of Baron Hill. He was succeeded by his son, the MP Richard Thelwall Price (1720–1775).
