= Ellis Lloyd (of Rhiwgogh) =

Ellis Lloyd was a Welsh politician who sat in the House of Commons in 1614.

Lloyd was the son of Robert Lloyd of Rhiwgoch and his wife Margaret Nanney, daughter of Hugh Nanney of Nannau, Dolgelly. In 1614, he was elected Member of Parliament for Merioneth.

Lloyd's daughter Jane married Henry Wynn later MP for Merioneth.

Parliament of England
| Preceded by Edward Herbert | Member of Parliament for Merioneth; 1614 | Succeeded by William Salesbury |
