= Griffith Nanney =

Welsh 16C politician

Griffith Nanney was the member of the Parliament of England for the constituency of Merioneth (Wales) in 1593.
