= Cadwaladr Price =

Cadwaladr Price of Rhiwlas was the member of Parliament for the constituency of Merioneth in 1584.
