= 1899 Merionethshire by-election =

UK parliamentary by-election

The 1899 Merionethshire by-election was a parliamentary by-election held for the UK House of Commons constituency of Merionethshire on 2 May 1899.

== Vacancy ==
The by-election was caused by the death of the sitting Liberal MP, Thomas Edward Ellis on 5 April 1899.

== Candidates ==
Merionethshire Liberal Association considered a number of possible candidates but the favourite from an early stage was Owen Morgan Edwards, an academic at Lincoln College, Oxford, a native of Merionethshire who was described as an ardent Welsh Nationalist. Edwards was hardly enthusiastic to take up the offer of being the Liberal candidate. He wrote to Dr Edward Jones, chairman of the county Liberals, that he had many days of anxiety and sleepless nights since learning he was the front-runner. He said that he would be relieved if not called upon to stand and would rather not take the position unless absolutely needed.

The Conservatives had fought Merionethshire at the 1895 general election and at its meeting in Dolgellau on 14 April 1899 resolved that the seat should be contested at the by-election. No candidate was selected at that time however and the matter was postponed. Once Edwards was adopted by the Liberals, the Conservatives met again at Barmouth and this time decided not to oppose him.

== Result ==
There being no other candidates putting themselves forward, Edwards was returned unopposed. He did not enjoy parliamentary life however, and did not seek re-election at the general election of 1900.

1899 Merionethshire by-election
Party	Candidate	Votes	%	±%
Liberal	Owen Morgan Edwards	Unopposed		
Registered electors				
Liberal hold				

== See also ==
- Lists of United Kingdom by-elections
- United Kingdom by-election records
