= John Vaughan (MP for Merioneth) =

John Vaughan was a Welsh politician who sat in the House of Commons in 1654. He fought in the Royalist army in the English Civil War.

John Vaughan of Kevenbodig was a captain in the Royalist army and a commissioner of array in 1642. However, by 1654 he was accepted by the Commonwealth authorises and was elected in that year as Member of Parliament for Merioneth. His election was opposed in a petition by Rice Vaughan of Grays Inn.

Parliament of England
Preceded by Not represented in Barebones Parliament	Member of Parliament for Merioneth; 1654	Succeeded by John Jones
