= Humphrey Foulkes =

Welsh priest and antiquarian

Humphrey Foulkes (1673–1737) was a Welsh priest and antiquarian.

== Life ==
Foulkes was the son of David Foulkes from Llannefydd in Denbighshire, North Wales. Foulkes studied at Jesus College, Oxford, obtaining his Bachelor of Arts degree in 1695 and his Master of Arts in 1698; he later obtained a Doctorate of Divinity (1720). Ordained in 1700, he held the living of St George in Denbighshire in 1702, later becoming prebend of Llanfair at St Asaph Cathedral (1705). In 1709, he became rector of Marchwiel, Denbighshire, and sinecure rector of Llanfor, Merionethshire in 1713. In addition to his church duties, he wrote on life in Wales in the Middle Ages and corresponded with Edward Lhuyd on various topics of mutual interest.
