= Richard John Lloyd Price =

Welsh squire

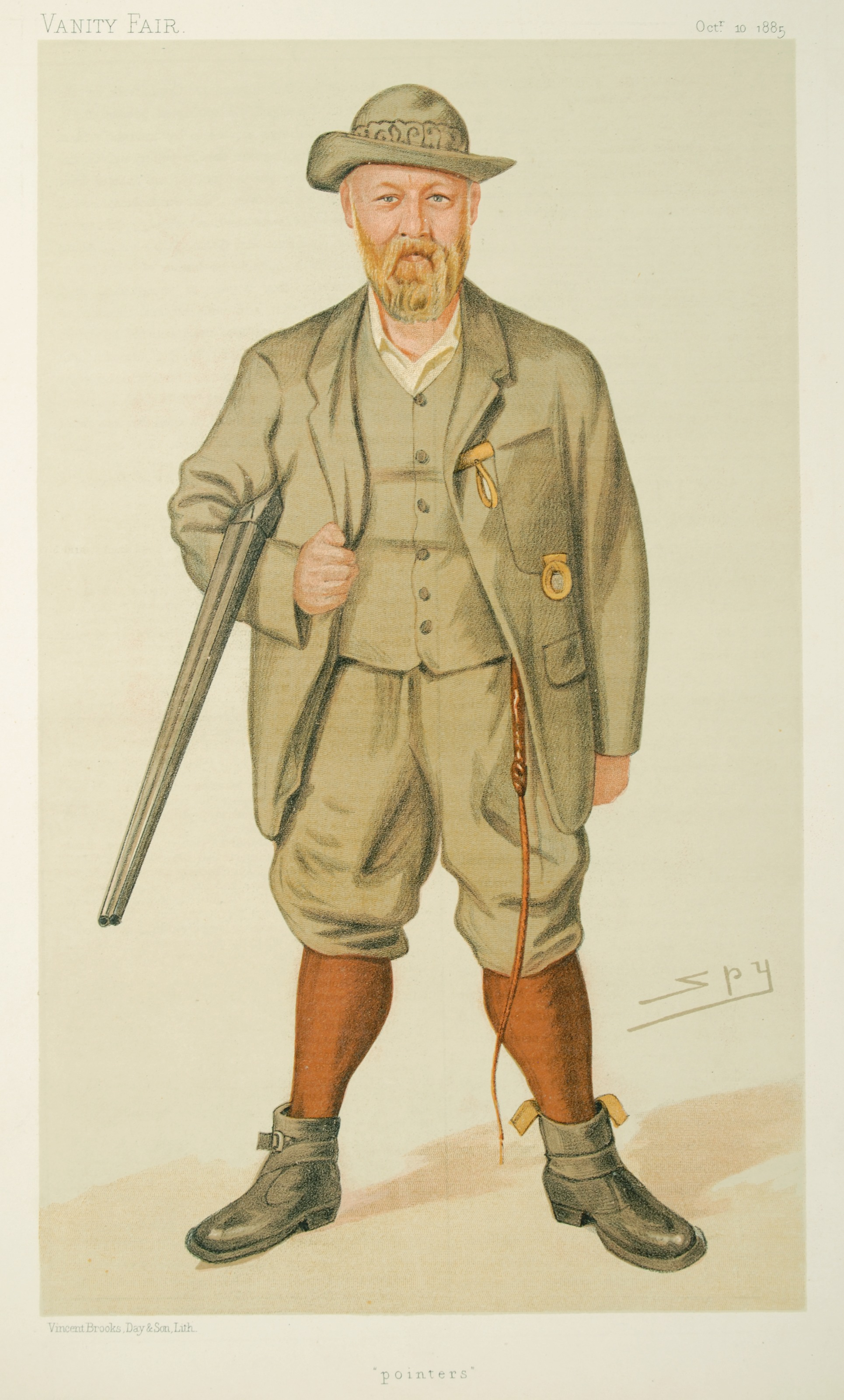
- "pointers". Caricature of Richard John Lloyd Price of Rhiwlas by Spy published in Vanity Fair on 10 October 1885
- Born: 17 April 1843; Bala, Gwynedd, Wales
- Died: 9 January 1923 (aged 79)
- Education: Eton College
- Alma mater: Christ Church, Oxford

Richard John Lloyd Price DL, JP (17 April 1843 – 9 January 1923), was squire of Rhiwlas Estate (about 64,000 acres in North Wales). He was a journalist, author, and judge at field trials and dog shows — best known as the organizer of the first sheepdog trials held in the U.K.

== Life & Legacy ==
Price was born in Bala, Gwynedd, Wales in 1843. He was educated at Eton and at Christ Church, Oxford. He was appointed High Sheriff of Merionethshire for the year 1868. On 20 April 1869 he married Evelyn Gregge-Hopwood. Their son was Robert Kenrick Price (1870–1927). In 1873 R. J. Lloyd Price's friend Sewallis Shirley started The Kennel Club and also persuaded Price to hold at his estate in Rhiwlas the U.K.'s first sheepdog field trials. In 1887 R. J. Lloyd Price established the Welsh Whiskey Distillery at Frongoch. His great-grandson Robin Price became heir to the Rhiwlas Estate and president of the International Sheep Dog Society and then honorary vice-president of that society.

== Books by R. J. Lloyd Price ==
- Rabbits for profit and rabbits for powder. 1884.
- Practical pheasant rearing. 1888.
- Dogs ancient and modern, and Walks in Wales. 1893. OCLC 20641851.
- Rulace, Ruedok, and the Valley of the Welsh Dee. 1899.
