= T. E. Ellis =

Welsh politician and leader of Cymru Fydd

Parliamentary Secretary to the Treasury
- In office 1894–1895
- Monarch: Victoria
- Prime Minister: Archibald Primrose
- Preceded by: Edward Marjoribanks
- Succeeded by: Sir William Hood Walrond

Personal details
- Born: 16 February 1859
- Died: 5 April 1899 (aged 40)
- Party: Liberal
- Education: Aberystwyth College; New College, Oxford

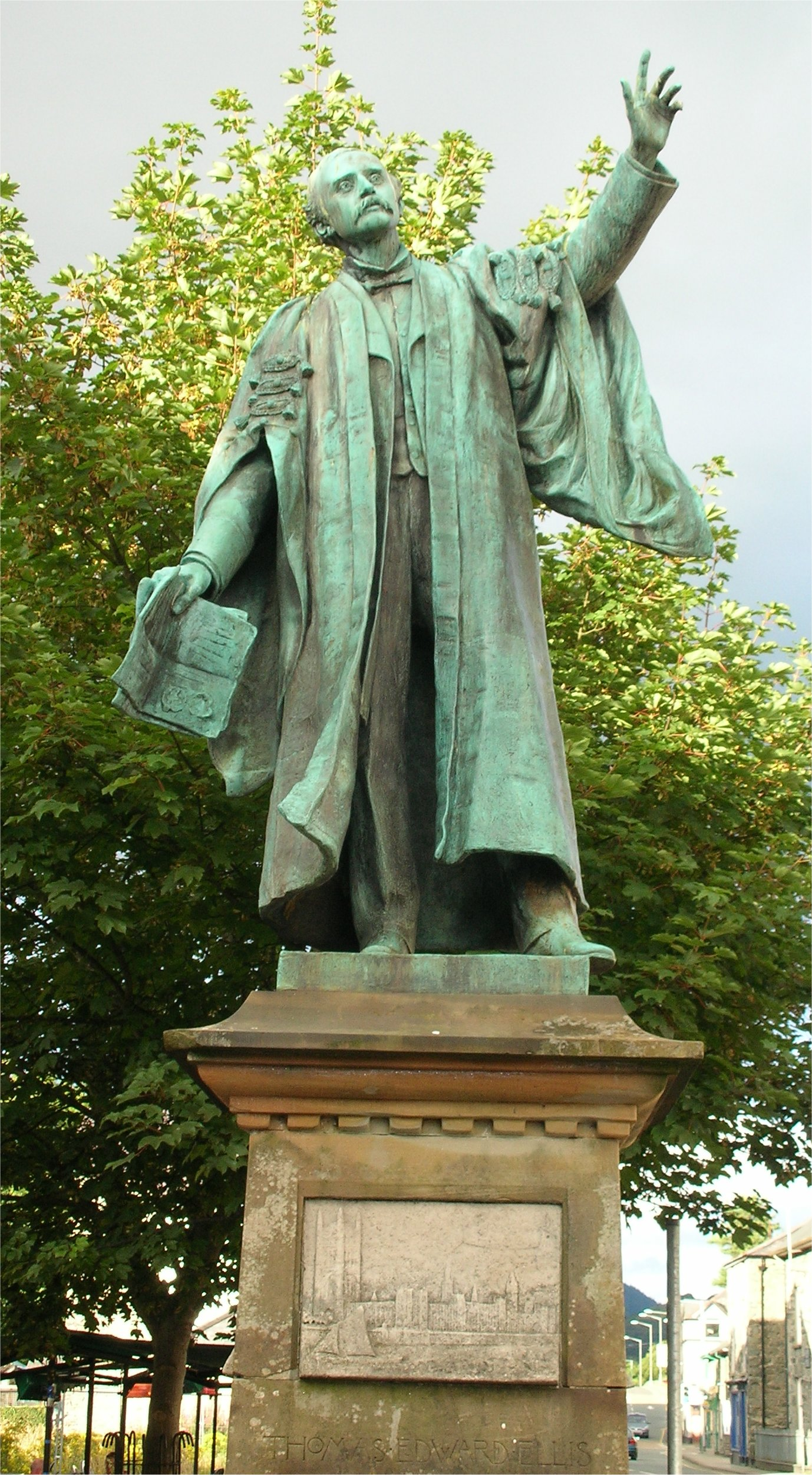
Statue on the main shopping street in Bala

Thomas Edward Ellis (16 February 1859 – 5 April 1899), often known as T. E. Ellis or Tom Ellis, was a Welsh politician who was the leader of Cymru Fydd, a movement aimed at gaining home rule for Wales. Ellis was, for a time, the most prominent of a generation of Liberal politicians who emerged in Wales after 1886, who placed greater emphasis than the previous generation to a Welsh dimension to their politics. His early death in 1899 aged 40 added to the aura that surrounded his name.

== Early life ==
T. E. Ellis was born at Cefnddwysarn near Bala, the son of a tenant farmer, and was brought up among folk memories of the political evictions in Merioneth following the 1859 and 1868 General Elections. Having attended Bala Grammar School, where his fellow pupils included Owen Morgan Edwards, he progressed to the University of Wales, Aberystwyth, (then Aberystwyth college) from 1875 to 1879, then went to New College, Oxford, graduating in history in 1884.

On leaving Oxford, Ellis briefly went into journalism and also acted as a private tutor to the son of a South Wales shipping magnate. He then became private secretary to Liberal Party MP, John Brunner. This took him to London and drew him closer to political life. In 1892, he was one of the founder members of the Aberystwyth Old Students' Association and was president from 1892 to 1898.

== Parliamentary career ==
In 1886, he was selected as the Liberal Party candidate for the Merionethshire constituency, and was elected the same year at the general election.

Ellis quickly became prominent as a spokesman for Welsh concerns, and in a speech in Bala in 1890 called for a legislative assembly for Wales. He became the leader of the Cymru Fydd movement which sought to gain home rule for Wales, cooperating closely with David Lloyd George, and also played a prominent part in the campaign for Welsh disestablishment. In 1892 when Gladstone formed a new administration, Ellis accepted the post of the second whip, which meant that he had to withdraw from the movement, whose leadership was taken over by Lloyd George and Herbert Lewis (MP for Flint Boroughs). In 1894 Ellis was appointed Chief Whip.

Ellis also published the first volume of the collected works of the 17th century Welsh Puritan writer Morgan Llwyd, a work completed after his death by his brother in law, J. H. Davies. He died in Cannes in February 1899. His son, the academic Thomas Iorwerth Ellis, wrote a two-volume biography of him, the volumes being published in 1944 and 1948 respectively.

Ellis was a proponent of Pan-Celticism, stating "We must work for bringing together Celtic reformers and Celtic peoples. The interests of Irishmen, Welshmen and [Scottish] Crofters are almost identical. Their past history is very similar, their present oppressors are the same and their immediate wants are the same.

== Personal life ==
Ellis married Annie Jane, daughter of Robert J. Davies and sister of John Humphreys Davies. They had one son, his biographer Thomas Iorwerth Ellis, who was born posthumously in December 1899.

== Assessment ==
Tom Ellis, according to Kenneth O. Morgan, was a "nationalist of a complex kind". On the one hand, he was deeply rooted in the Methodist tradition, with a love of Welsh poetry and literature. He regarded himself as a follower of Mazzini, and his support for Cymru Fydd made him a prominent advocate of Home Rule. In contrast, he became an admirer of Cecil Rhodes, whom he had met in Cape Colony and his acceptance of government office attracted criticism from some of his erstwhile supporters.

== Bibliography ==
- Hughes, Dewi Rowland (1997). "O'r Bala i Dde Affrica. Taith Wleidyddol Tom Ellis (1886-1892)" (PDF). Traethodydd (in Welsh). CLII (643): 206–22.
- Wyn Jones, Thomas Edward Ellis: 1859-1899 (University of Wales Press, 1986)
- Neville Masterman: The Forerunner: The Dilemmas of Tom Ellis, 1859-1899 (Christopher Davies, Swansea, 1972) ISBN 0-7154-0012-6
- Morgan, Kenneth O. (1981). Rebirth of a Nation. Wales 1880-1980. Cardiff: University of Wales Press. ISBN 0-19-821760-9.
- Roberts, Thomas Rowland; Williams, Robert (1908). Eminent Welshmen: a short biographical dictionary of Welshmen who have attained distinction from the earliest times to the present, Volume 1. Educational Publishing Company. ISBN 9780788437717.
- Meic Stephens (Editor): The New Companion to the Literature of Wales (University of Wales Press, Cardiff, 1998) ISBN 0-7083-1383-3

Parliament of the United Kingdom
Preceded by Henry Robertson	Member of Parliament for Merionethshire; 1886 – 1899	Succeeded by Owen Morgan Edwards
Political offices
Preceded by Edward Marjoribanks	Parliamentary Secretary to the Treasury; 1894–1895	Succeeded by Sir William Hood Walrond
Professional and academic associations
New office	President of the Aberystwyth Old Students' Association; 1892–98	Succeeded by Prof. D. E. Jones
