= Henry Haydn Jones =

British politician

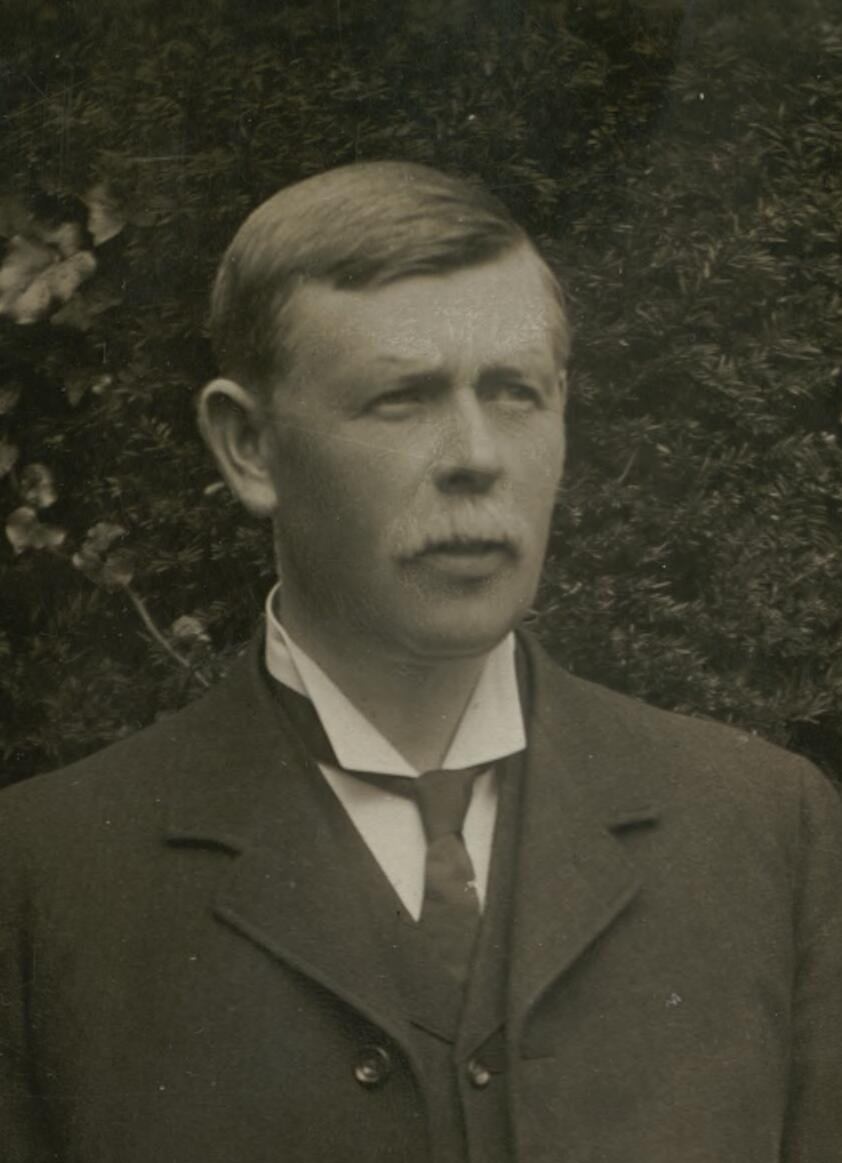
Henry Haydn Jones

Sir Henry Haydn Jones (27 December 1863 – 2 July 1950) was a Welsh Liberal Party politician.

== Upbringing ==
Henry (sometimes known as "Harry") Haydn Jones was born in Ruthin, Wales. He was the son of Joseph David Jones (1827–70), a schoolmaster in the town and a respected Welsh musician and composer. After the early death of his father, Haydn Jones was brought up by uncles at Towyn (now called Tywyn) where he was educated at the Board School & Academy. In 1903 he married Barbara Annie Gwendolen Davies Jones, daughter of Lewis D. Jones, who was Welsh-born and the original agent for Price Waterhouse & Co. in the U.S.

== Politics ==
In 1889, Haydn Jones was elected as one of the first members of Merionethshire County Council, representing the Towyn Urban District. A year later he was the chair of the council. He was eventually elected an Alderman. Jones continued to rise in the political world being elected as the MP for Merioneth at the January 1910 general election. He continued to serve in this role until 1945 general election, when aged 81. He was knighted in 1937.

== Business ==
In 1909, the Bryn Eglwys slate quarry, the Abergynolwyn estate and village and the Talyllyn Railway came up for sale. Aware of the distress which would be caused by permanent closure of the quarry Sir Haydn bought the lot himself in 1911 for £5250, and became the sole owner of what became the Abergynolwyn Slate and Slab Company. In 1935 he extended his quarry ownership, leasing the Aberllefenni Slate Quarry in the neighbouring Corris district.

The quarrying and slate business did well until the early 1920s when demand fell and the Bryn Eglwys quarry was only kept open by pillaring the easy to obtain slate rather than by digging out new underground chambers. At times there was a three-day week, but the quarry soldiered on until 1941 when Sir Haydn's lease expired. He continued on a yearly lease until 1946 when a roof fall caused by the continued pillaring closed the quarry for good.

== Talyllyn Railway ==
By buying Bryn Eglwys, Haydn Jones had become effectively owner of the Talyllyn Railway built to carry slate from the quarry to Tywyn. After the quarry collapse and closure in 1946, the railway had little reason to continue operating. Haydn Jones declared that the railway would remain open while he remained alive and it continued to run until 1950. After his death, his widow reached an arrangement with L. T. C. Rolt and his associates allowing them to lease the railway, which continues operating to this day.

One of the Talyllyn locomotives, ex-Corris Railway No.3, was named Sir Haydn after him in 1951. This was more appropriate than was known at the time, as Sir Haydn's strong support of the Corris Railway during his time as lessee of Aberllefenni Quarry was instrumental in the railway continuing to operate throughout World War Two and the locomotive therefore avoiding the wartime scrap drive.

It is in his role as owner of the Talyllyn Railway that Sir Haydn Jones became a figure known, albeit not by name, to many small children. One of the early railway preservation people who joined Rolt was the Rev. W.V. Awdry, and in the form of the owner of the Skarloey Railway, Sir Haydn was immortalised in his books as Sir Handel Brown. As in real life, loco No.3 on the Skarloey Railway was named after him as Sir Handel.

== Papers and legacy ==
The papers of Sir Henry Haydn Jones are archived at the National Library of Wales, donated by his widow in 1995. Sir Henry Haydn Jones succeeded (barely) in keeping his promise that the railway would outlive him. After the railway was revived by L. T. C. Rolt and others it prospered and became a major Welsh tourist attraction and flagship to the infant Heritage railway movement. Quarrying at Aberllefenni finished in 2003, although in 2019, slate is still processed at the mill there.

== Sources ==
- Boyd, J. I. C. (1988). The Tal-y-Llyn Railway. Wild Swan.; ISBN 0-906867-46-0
- Holmes, Alan (1986). Slates from Abergynolwyn. Gwynedd Archives Service.; ISBN 0-901337-42-0
- Potter, David (1990). The Talyllyn Railway. David St John Thomas.; ISBN 0-946537-50-X
- Who was Who, OUP 2007

Parliament of the United Kingdom
Preceded by Sir Osmond Williams	Member of Parliament for Merioneth; January 1910–1945	Succeeded by Emrys Roberts
