= Richard Richards (Merioneth MP) =

Richard Richards (22 September 1787 – 27 November 1860) was the member of Parliament for the constituency of Merioneth from 1836 to 1852. He was a Master of the Court of Chancery.

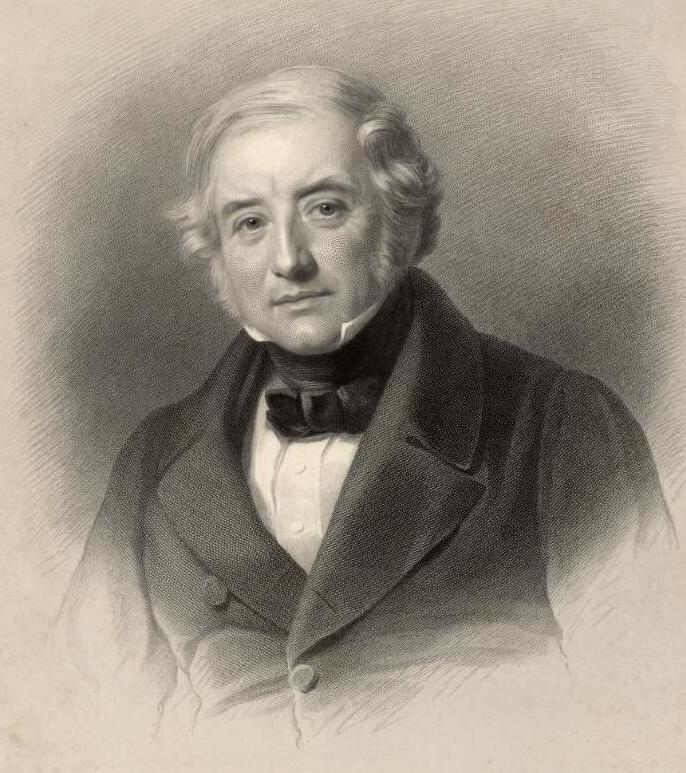
Portrait of Richard Richards (4674581) (cropped)
