= Emrys Roberts (Liberal politician) =

British politician

Emrys Roberts

Emrys Owen Roberts CBE (22 September 1910 – 29 October 1990) was a Welsh Liberal politician and businessman.

== Education & early career ==
Emrys Roberts was born in Caernarfon and educated at Caernarfon Grammar School, at University College of Wales, Aberystwyth, where he gained a law degree, Gonville and Caius College, Cambridge, and the Graduate Institute of International Studies in Geneva. He served in the RAF during the Second World War, reaching the rank of Squadron Leader. He was called to the bar at Gray's Inn in 1944.

Roberts served as the Liberal Member of Parliament for Merionethshire between 1945 and 1951, when he lost the seat to Labour, possibly due to tactical voting. He was also sometime Chairman of the Welsh Liberal Party. By 1947 he had been awarded the MBE. He was Chairman of the Development Board for Rural Wales between 1977 and 1981, and a member of a large number of other public bodies in Wales including being Chairman of the Eisteddfod Council. He was active in the Parliament for Wales Campaign launched in 1950, chaired by Lady Megan Lloyd George but by the time the campaign got into top gear both he and Lady Megan had lost their Parliamentary seats.

== Political career ==
In 1945 and 1950 Roberts had been opposed by Labour, Conservative and Plaid Cymru candidates. The Plaid Cymru candidate was Gwynfor Evans later to be the first ever PC Member of Parliament. Some months before the election, Roberts had argued that the Liberal Party should adopt specific measures relating to Wales including the establishment of a Secretary of State for Wales and a Welsh National Development Council. The manifesto, however, only advocate a vague commitment to 'suitable measures of devolution'.

In 1950, Roberts increased his majority after a campaign invigorated by a meeting addressed by veteran Liberal, Lord Samuel.

Evans did not stand in 1951 but instead of the Plaid votes transferring to the Liberals, they went Labour as nationalist voters preferred a socialist Labour party to a nationalist Liberal one. Jo Grimond wrote to Roberts after the election saying he had thought Roberts would hold his seat believing the former Plaid voters would transfer to him but there were other local factors operating in the constituency, notably a lack of organisation and preparation compared to the other parties

== The Radical Liberals ==
The immediate post-war period continued to be difficult for the Liberal Party in terms of political positioning. There was an ideological debate going on as to whether the party should be a party of classical liberal ideas, Free Trade, small government and individual liberty or if it should stand for social liberalism in the more recent traditions of H H Asquith's post-1908 administration, the economic thinking of John Maynard Keynes and the social and industrial heritage of William Beveridge and David Lloyd George. Together with Lady Megan Lloyd George and Edgar Granville, Roberts was one of a group of MPs determined to stand up against what they saw as the party's drift to the Right under the leadership of Clement Davies and to save its Radical soul. In 1950, Roberts criticised Davies saying that the party was being badly led and that he should be consulting the Deputy Leader (Lady Megan) rather than the Chief Whip on matters of policy in the first instance. As a reward for their pro-Labour leanings (see also next section below) and support of the Labour government in Parliamentary votes, the Conservatives decided to renew their opposition against Lady Megan in Anglesey and Roberts in Merioneth and their intervention was a critical factor in the loss of these two long-standing Liberal seats. By way of contrast, the Conservatives declined to stand candidates in the constituencies held by Clement Davies, Roderic Bowen and Rhys Hopkin Morris who had the reputation of being more right-wing, all of whom held their seats. After the 1951 general election a number of leading Radicals gave up on the Liberal Party with Lady Megan and Granville defecting to Labour followed soon after by other former MPs Dingle Foot and Wilfrid Roberts.

== After Parliament ==
Emrys Roberts did not join the Labour Party but he largely withdrew from up active politics and devoted himself to a business career. He later became the Director of the Branded Textiles Group. However he did not lose his interest in progressive politics. In 1982 at the height of the difficulties afflicting the Liberal/SDP Alliance over seats negotiations and the dip in support for the Alliance in the polls, he wrote to The Times proposing that the Alliance parties should have a single, joint, leader for the next general election and that there should be a merger of the parties once the election was over. He reminded readers that in 1951 he and Lady Megan Lloyd George had entered into talks with Herbert Morrison, proposing a working relationship between the Labour government, with its majority of eight and the Liberal Party which had nine MPs. According to Roberts, Morrison was well disposed to the idea but Attlee's decision to dissolve Parliament and call the October 1951 general election put an end to it. Roberts added that the Lib-Lab Pact concluded between David Steel and James Callaghan in 1977-78 achieved what he and Lady Megan had been trying to do in 1951.

From 1968 to 1977, Roberts was Chairman of the Mid-Wales Development Corporation and then Chairman of the Development Board for Rural Wales from 1977 to 1981. He was a member of the Welsh Development Agency, 1977–81 and Director of the Development Corporation of Wales, 1978–81.

== Records and papers ==
Records and papers collected by Emrys Roberts between 1959 and 1981, including correspondence and papers relating to the National Eisteddfod, 1959–1976; the Development Board for Rural Wales, 1973–1981; and Wales West and North Television, 1961–1963, papers relating to other committees on which Emrys Roberts sat, 1967–1983, and other miscellaneous papers, 1945-1972 are deposited in the National Library of Wales. Roberts was also Vice-President of the Honourable Society of Cymmrodorion

== Death ==
Roberts died in October 1990.

== Sources ==
=== Books and Journals ===
- Jones, J. Graham (June 1993). "The Liberal Party and Wales, 1945-79" (PDF). Welsh History Review. 16 (3): 326–55.

Parliament of the United Kingdom
Preceded by Henry Haydn Jones	Member of Parliament for Merioneth; 1945 – 1951	Succeeded by Thomas William Jones
Party political offices
Preceded by Roderic Bowen	President of the Welsh Liberal Federation; 1949–1951	Succeeded by ?
