= Robert Salesbury =

Member of the Parliament of England

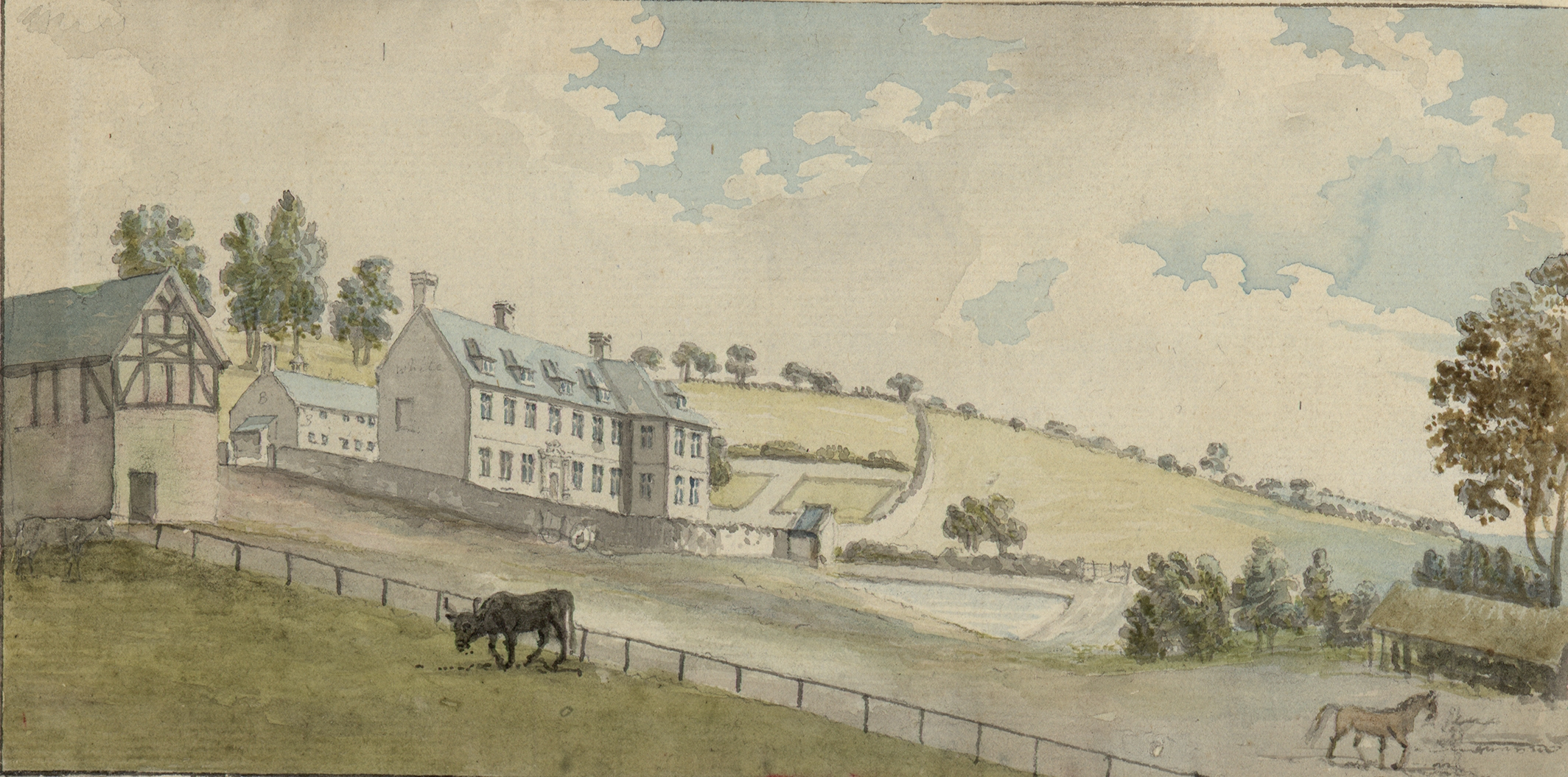
Bachymbyd, Llanynys

Robert Salesbury (1567–1599), of Rûg, Corwen, Merionethshire and Bachymbyd, Llanynys, Denbighshire and Pool Park, Ruthin, Denbighshire, was a Welsh politician.

He was the heir of his father, John Salesbury (MP), and a member of the Salusbury family of Rug.

He was a Member (MP) of the Parliament of England for Denbighshire in 1586 and Merioneth in 1589.
