= Henry Wynn (politician) =

Welsh politician

Henry Wynn (c. 1602 – 27 July 1671) was a Welsh politician who sat in the House of Commons at various times between 1624 and 1671.

Wynn was the son of Sir John Wynn, 1st Baronet of Gwydir. He was admitted to Inner Temple in November 1618. In 1624 he was elected Member of Parliament for Merioneth and was re-elected in 1625. He was called to the bar in 1629.

In April 1640, Wynn was elected MP for Merioneth again in the Short Parliament.

In 1661, Wynn was elected MP for Merioneth in the Cavalier Parliament and sat until his death in 1671.

Wynn died at the age of 69 and is commemorated by a monument in Wynnstay Chapel, Ruabon Church.

Wynn married Jane Lloyd, daughter of Ellis Lloyd of Rhiwgogh.

Parliament of England
Preceded by William Salisbury	Member of Parliament for Merioneth; 1624–1625	Succeeded by Edward Vaughan
Vacant Parliament suspended since 1629	Member of Parliament for Merioneth; 1640	William Price
