= William Edwards (British politician) =

British politician

Member of Parliament for Merioneth
- In office 31 March 1966 – 8 February 1974
- Preceded by: Thomas Jones
- Succeeded by: Dafydd Elis-Thomas

Personal details
- Born: William Henry Edwards; 6 January 1938
- Died: 16 August 2007 (aged 69)
- Party: Labour

William Henry Edwards (6 January 1938 – 16 August 2007), also known as Will Edwards, was a British Labour politician.

Edwards was born in Amlwch, Anglesey. His father Owen Henry Edwards was a tenant farmer and his mother was a seamstress. He was educated at the local Grammar School and at Sir Thomas Jones' Comprehensive School. He read law at Liverpool University and studied at London College of Law. He became a solicitor in Bala and a visiting lecturer at Liverpool College of Commerce. He married Eleri Rogers in 1962.

Edwards contested West Flintshire in the 1964 general election. He became Member of Parliament for Merioneth at the 1966 general election, and became Parliamentary Private Secretary to the Secretary of State for Wales, Cledwyn Hughes. He increased his majority in 1970 despite a strong challenge by future Plaid Cymru leader Dafydd Wigley. He became a front-bench spokesman on Welsh affairs, in a team headed by George Thomas, but was sacked in 1972 over his support for entry into the European Economic Community. He lost his seat in the February 1974 general election to Plaid Cymru's Dafydd Elis Thomas, and was unable to regain the seat in the general election that quickly followed that October. He was then appointed to lead Labour's campaign in Wales for a "yes" vote in the referendum to remain in the EEC. In 1981, he was selected to fight Ynys Môn, but withdrew in March 1983, shortly before the 1983 general election, in protest at Labour's policies of withdrawal from the EEC, unilateral nuclear disarmament, and closure of US military bases in the UK.

He was a member of the Historic Buildings Council for Wales from 1971 to 1976, and began to edit The Solicitor's Diary for Waterlow's in 1973. In 1987, a Law Society tribunal struck him off the roll of solicitors infringing the solicitors' accounts rules, and improper use of clients' funds.

In later life, he suffered from diabetes and heart disease. He died in the Wrexham Maelor Hospital. He was survived by his wife and their son and three daughters.

Parliament of the United Kingdom
Preceded by Thomas Jones	Member of Parliament for Merionethshire; 1966 – February 1974	Succeeded by Dafydd Elis Thomas
