= William Watkin Edward Wynne =

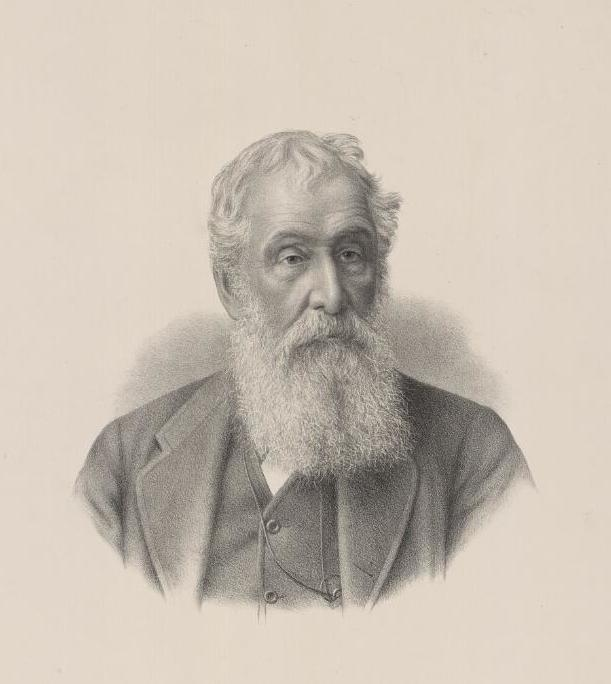
Portrait of William Watkin Edward Wynne

William Watkin Edward Wynne (23 December 1801 – 9 June 1880) was a Welsh Conservative Party politician and antiquarian.

== Life ==
Wynne was born on 23 December 1801 in Denbighshire, Wales, and educated at Westminster School and Jesus College, Oxford. He married Mary Slaney, daughter of Robert Aglionby Slaney MP, and had a son named William Robert Maurice Wynne.

He was Conservative Member of Parliament (MP) for Merioneth from 1852 to 1865. He also served as High Sheriff of Merionethshire in 1867 and became constable of Harlech Castle in 1874. He was a director of the Newtown and Machynlleth Railway, formed in 1857.

He inherited a collection of manuscripts in 1859, known as the Hengwrt collection, from his kinsman Sir Robert Vaughan, 2nd Baronet. The collection had been assembled by the 17th-century antiquarian Robert Vaughan and it contained an early version of the Canterbury Tales, mystery plays in Cornish and many early Welsh manuscripts, including twelve manuscripts of the Welsh laws of Hywel Dda. Wynne catalogued the manuscripts, publishing the result in Archaeologia Cambrensis between 1869 and 1871, and allowed scholars to examine and copy them.

Wynne had considerable knowledge about the history and genealogy of north Wales, assisting other writers and contributing articles on Merionethshire to Archaeologia Cambrensis and elsewhere. He also wrote a history of Harlech Castle in 1878. He died on 9 June 1880.

== Sources ==
- Jones, Ieuan Gwynedd (1981). Explorations and Explanations. Essays in the Social History of Victorian Wales. Llandysul: Gomer. ISBN 0850886449.

Parliament of the United Kingdom
Preceded by Richard Richards	Member of Parliament for Merioneth; 1859 – 1865	Succeeded by William Robert Maurice Wynne
