= Merioneth (UK Parliament constituency) =

UK Parliament constituency (1801–1983)

- Former county constituency for the House of Commons

1542–1983
- Seats: one
- Replaced by: Clwyd South West and Meirionnydd Nant Conwy

Merioneth, sometimes called Merionethshire, was a constituency in North Wales established in 1542, which returned one Member of Parliament (MP) to the House of Commons of the English Parliament, and later to the Parliament of Great Britain and of the United Kingdom. It was abolished for the 1983 general election, when it was largely replaced by the new constituency of Meirionnydd Nant Conwy.

== Overview ==
=== Boundaries ===
The constituency consisted of the historic county of Merionethshire. Merioneth was always an almost entirely rural constituency, rocky and mountainous with grazing the only useful agricultural activity that could be pursued; quarrying was its other main economic mainstay. It was also a strongly Welsh-speaking area (a parliamentary paper in 1904 listed that just 6.2% of the population could only speak English, lower than in any other county in Wales), and by the 19th century was a stronghold of non-conformist religion.

=== Establishment ===
Like the rest of Wales, Merioneth was given the right to representation by the Laws in Wales Acts 1535-1542, and first returned an MP to the Parliament of 1542; however, unlike all the other Welsh counties, Merioneth had no towns sufficiently important in the 16th century to merit borough status, so the county MP was its only representative. The MP was chosen by the first past the post electoral system – when there was a contest at all, which was almost unheard of before the second half of the 19th century.

=== Franchise and political influences before the Reform Act ===
As in other county constituencies, the franchise until 1832 was defined by the Forty Shilling Freeholder Act, which gave the right to vote to every man who possessed freehold property within the county valued at £2 or more per year for the purposes of land tax; it was not necessary for the freeholder to occupy his land, nor even in later years to be resident in the county at all. Nevertheless, the electorate was small, probably only a few hundred, though the lack of contested elections make it impossible to be sure: at the 1774 election, the only one to go to a poll in the 18th century, exactly 600 votes were cast. By way of comparison, the population at the time of the 1831 census was about 34,500.

For more than a century before the Reform Act, Merioneth's representation was almost entirely monopolised by the Vaughan family of Corsygedol – they and the Wynns of Wynnstay, who supported them, were the two leading families of the county and the expense of a contested election was presumably seen as futile by any potential opposition candidates. When a magnate from outside the county, The Earl of Powis, did intervene in 1774, his candidate was roundly defeated. Since the Vaughans were not aligned with any of the great aristocratic interests of the rest of Wales, and were generally regarded as maintaining their independence, there was little partisan interest in dislodging them.

=== Survival as a constituency with low population ===
Although the franchise was somewhat extended under the Great Reform Act, Merioneth's registered electorate at the first post-Reform election was only 580. However, it seems that this considerably under-represented those who were eligible, and more voters could be induced to register by vigorous campaigning. The Liberation Society, a body aiming to maximise the non-conformist vote to achieve disestablishment of the church, was active in Merioneth and a number of other Welsh counties in the 1850s and 1860s, and between the elections of 1859 and 1865 Merioneth's electorate rose by 50%, from 1,091 to 1,527. But there was also a dramatic rise in the electorate between 1835 and 1837 (from 698 to 1,336), which is less easy to explain. Nevertheless, even with these occasional peaks, Merioneth was a small constituency by Welsh – let alone English – standards.

By the time of the 1911 census, the population of Merioneth was 46,849, and in other circumstances it would have been too small to survive as a separate constituency, but the physical geography meant that the inconvenience which would be caused to voters and MPs alike by combining it with a neighbouring county outweighed any arguments for mathematical equality of representation. In 1929, the first election at which all adult men and women had the vote, Merioneth's electorate was under 29,000, and it had fallen even further (to 27,619) by the time of the final (1979) election before the constituency was abolished, even with the extension of the franchise to 18- to 21-year-olds in the 1960s.

=== Political character after the 1860s ===
The gentry returned unopposed as MPs in Merioneth's deferential days had usually been Conservatives. At the 1850 general election, the sitting member, W.W.E. Wynne of Peniarth, was challenged by the Liberal, David Williams. In an election characterised by allegations of coercion against the nonconformist tenantry, Wynne held the seat by a small majority. In 1865, Wynne stood down, and was succeeded as Conservative candidate by his son, W.R.M. Wynne. Against some expectations, he held the seat with a slightly reduced majority, and this was attributed by Ieuan Gwynedd Jones to 'a sense of terror' that had struck the mainly nonconformist tenant farmers. In 1868, following the extension of the franchise, Wynne withdrew rather than face another contest which he was likely to lose. With the introduction of the secret ballot, Merioneth became one of the safest Liberal seats in Wales – mainly the effect of the high number of workers in the slate and limestone quarries round Ffestiniog and Corwen. With the foundation of the Labour Party, the seat became less safe, but the Liberals held it through the first half of the 20th century, losing it to Labour, when Emrys Roberts was defeated by T.W. Jones. The Liberals remained the main challengers until the 1960s. However, with the emergence of Plaid Cymru as a political force, Merioneth was natural territory for the nationalists: they overtook the Liberals for second place behind Labour in 1970, and then Dafydd Elis-Thomas captured the seat at the February 1974 election, one of the first two seats the party had won at a general election. They retained it comfortably in October 1974 and 1979.

=== Abolition ===
The constituency was finally abolished with effect from the 1983 general election, when the alignment of constituency boundaries with the revised Welsh county boundaries necessitated a change. The Boundary Commission's original proposals would have united Merioneth with English-speaking Conwy on the North Wales coast, and would almost certainly have extinguished Plaid Cymru's chances of holding the seat, but after a public enquiry much more modest changes were adopted. The bulk of the electorate formed the core of the new Meirionnydd Nant Conwy constituency, joined by only around 5,000 voters from outside the old county, while about 3,000 voters in that part of Merionethshire which had been placed in Clwyd rather than Gwynedd moved to the new Clwyd South West constituency.

== Members of Parliament ==
=== MPs 1542–1640 ===
Parliament	Member
1542	Edward Stanley
1545	Rhys Vaughan
1547	Lewis ap Owen
1553 (Mar)	Lewis ap Owen
1553 (Oct)	John Salesbury
1554 (Apr)	Lewis ap Owen
1554 (Nov)	Lewis ap Owen
1555	
1558	Ellis Price
1559 (Jan)	John Wyn ap Cadwaladr
1563 (Jan)	Ellis Price
1571	Hugh Owen
1572	John Lewis Owen
1584 (Nov)	Cadwaladr Price
1586	Robert Lloyd
1588 (Nov)	Robert Salusbury
1593	Griffith Nanney
1597 (Sep)	Thomas Myddelton
1601 (Oct)	Robert Lloyd
1604–1611	Sir Edward Herbert
1614	Ellis Lloyd
1621–1622	William Salisbury
1624	Henry Wynn
1625	Henty Wynn
1626	Edward Vaughan
1628–1629	Richard Vaughan
1629–1640	No Parliaments convened

=== MPs 1640–1983 ===
Year	Member	Party
April 1640	Henry Wynn	
November 1640	William Price	Royalist
February 1644	Price disabled from sitting – seat vacant	
1646	Roger Pope	
1647	John Jones	
1653	Merioneth was not represented in the Barebones Parliament	
1654	John Vaughan	
1656	Colonel John Jones	
January 1659	Lewis Owen	
May 1659	Merioneth was not represented in the restored Rump	
April 1660	Edmund Meyricke	
1661	Henry Wynn	
1673	William Price	
1679	Sir John Wynn	
1681	Sir Robert Owen	
1685	Sir John Wynn	
1695	Hugh Nanney	
1701	Richard Vaughan	
1734	William Vaughan	Independent
1768	John Pugh Pryse	
1774	Evan Lloyd Vaughan	Tory
1792	Sir Robert Vaughan	Tory
1836	Richard Richards	Conservative
1852	William Watkin Edward Wynne	Conservative
1865	W. R. M. Wynne	Conservative
1868	David Williams	Liberal
1870	Samuel Holland	Liberal
1885	Henry Robertson	Liberal
1886	T. E. Ellis	Liberal
1899	Owen Morgan Edwards	Liberal
1900	Sir Osmond Williams	Liberal
Jan 1910	Sir Henry Haydn Jones	Liberal
1945	Emrys Roberts	Liberal
1951	Thomas Jones	Labour
1966	Will Edwards	Labour
Feb 1974	Dafydd Elis-Thomas	Plaid Cymru
1983	constituency abolished: see Meirionnydd Nant Conwy	

== Election results ==
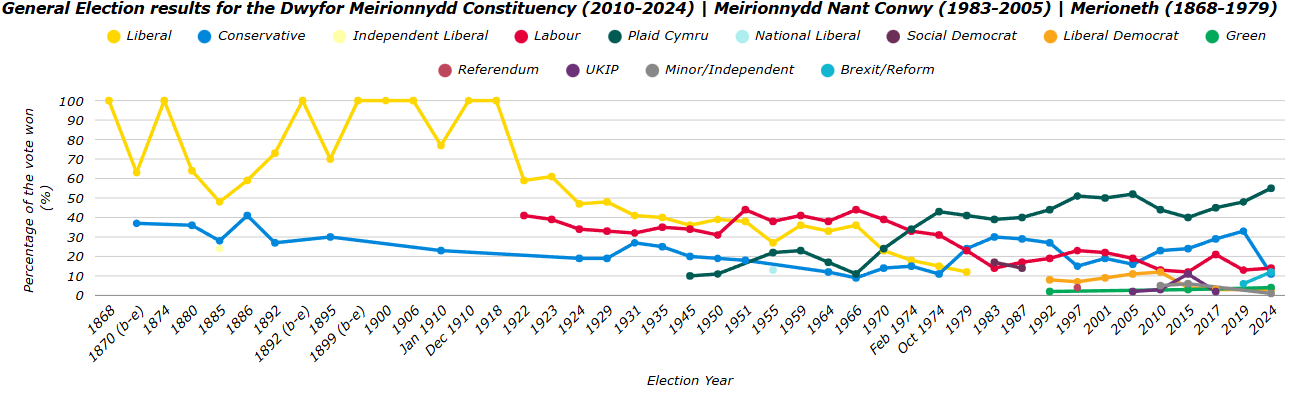
Graph to show the election results of the Merioneth/Merionethshire UK constituency and its successor seats. (1868-2024)

=== Elections in the 1830s ===
General election 1830: Merioneth
Party	Candidate	Votes	%
Tory	Robert Vaughan	Unopposed	
Registered electors		600	
Tory hold			

General election 1831: Merioneth
Party	Candidate	Votes	%
Tory	Robert Vaughan	Unopposed	
Registered electors		600	
Tory hold			

General election 1832: Merioneth
Party	Candidate	Votes	%
Tory	Robert Vaughan	Unopposed	
Registered electors		580	
Tory hold			

General election 1835: Merioneth
Party	Candidate	Votes	%
Conservative	Robert Vaughan	Unopposed	
Registered electors		698	
Conservative hold			

Vaughan resigned, causing a by-election.

By-election, 27 June 1836: Merioneth
Party	Candidate	Votes	%
Conservative	Richard Richards	501	77.0
Whig	William Wynn	150	23.0
Majority		351	54.0
Turnout		651	82.9
Registered electors		785	
Conservative hold			

General election 1837: Merioneth
Party	Candidate	Votes	%
Conservative	Richard Richards	Unopposed	
Registered electors		1,336	
Conservative hold			

=== Elections in the 1840s ===
General election 1841: Merioneth
Party	Candidate	Votes	%	±%
Conservative	Richard Richards	Unopposed		
Registered electors		1,306		
Conservative hold				

General election 1847: Merioneth
Party	Candidate	Votes	%	±%
Conservative	Richard Richards	Unopposed		
Registered electors		1,180		
Conservative hold				

=== Elections in the 1850s ===
General election 1852: Merioneth
Party	Candidate	Votes	%	±%
Conservative	William Watkin Edward Wynne	Unopposed		
Registered electors		1,006		
Conservative hold				

General election 1857: Merioneth
Party	Candidate	Votes	%	±%
Conservative	William Watkin Edward Wynne	Unopposed		
Registered electors		1,126		
Conservative hold				

General election 1859: Merioneth
Party	Candidate	Votes	%	±%
Conservative	William Watkin Edward Wynne	389	52.6	N/A
Liberal	David Williams	351	47.4	New
Majority		38	5.2	N/A
Turnout		740	67.8	N/A
Registered electors		1,091		
Conservative hold		Swing	N/A	

=== Elections in the 1860s ===
General election 1865: Merioneth
Party	Candidate	Votes	%	±%
Conservative	W. R. M. Wynne	610	51.3	−1.3
Liberal	David Williams	579	48.7	+1.3
Majority		31	2.6	−2.6
Turnout		1,189	77.9	+10.1
Registered electors		1,527		
Conservative hold		Swing	−1.3	

General election 1868: Merioneth
Party	Candidate	Votes	%	±%
Liberal	David Williams	Unopposed		
Registered electors		3,185		
Liberal gain from Conservative				

=== Elections in the 1870s ===
Williams' death caused a by-election.

By-election, 17 January 1870: Merioneth
Party	Candidate	Votes	%	±%
Liberal	Samuel Holland	1,610	62.6	N/A
Conservative	Charles John Tottenham	963	37.4	New
Majority		647	25.2	N/A
Turnout		2,573	80.7	N/A
Registered electors		3,187		
Liberal hold		Swing	N/A	

General election 1874: Merioneth
Party	Candidate	Votes	%	±%
Liberal	Samuel Holland	Unopposed		
Registered electors		3,335		
Liberal hold				

=== Elections in the 1880s ===
General election 1880: Merioneth
Party	Candidate	Votes	%	±%
Liberal	Samuel Holland	1,860	63.4	N/A
Conservative	Alexander Milne Dunlop	1,074	36.6	New
Majority		786	26.8	N/A
Turnout		2,934	82.2	N/A
Registered electors		3,571		
Liberal hold		Swing		

General election 1885: Merioneth
Party	Candidate	Votes	%	±%
Liberal	Henry Robertson	3,784	47.9	−15.5
Conservative	W. R. M. Wynne	2,209	28.0	−8.6
Independent Liberal	Morgan Lloyd	1,907	24.1	New
Majority		1,575	19.9	−6.9
Turnout		7,900	84.6	+2.4
Registered electors		9,333		
Liberal hold		Swing	−3.5	

T.E. Ellis

General election 1886: Merioneth
Party	Candidate	Votes	%	±%
Liberal	T. E. Ellis	4,127	59.1	+11.2
Conservative	John Vaughan	2,860	40.9	+12.9
Majority		1,267	18.2	−1.7
Turnout		6,987	74.9	−9.7
Registered electors		9,333		
Liberal hold		Swing	−0.9	

=== Elections in the 1890s ===
General election 1892: Merioneth
Party	Candidate	Votes	%	±%
Liberal	T. E. Ellis	5,175	72.8	+13.7
Conservative	Henry Owen	1,937	27.2	−13.7
Majority		3,238	45.6	+27.4
Turnout		7,112	77.8	+2.9
Registered electors		9,137		
Liberal hold		Swing	+13.7	

Ellis was appointed a Lord Commissioner of the Treasury, requiring a by-election.

By-election, 1892: Merioneth
Party	Candidate	Votes	%	±%
Liberal	T. E. Ellis	Unopposed		
Liberal hold				

General election 1895: Merioneth
Party	Candidate	Votes	%	±%
Liberal	T. E. Ellis	5,173	69.9	−2.9
Conservative	Charles Edward Jones Owen	2,232	30.1	+2.9
Majority		2,941	39.8	−5.8
Turnout		7,405	82.4	+4.6
Registered electors		8,983		
Liberal hold		Swing	−2.9	

Ellis' death caused a by-election.

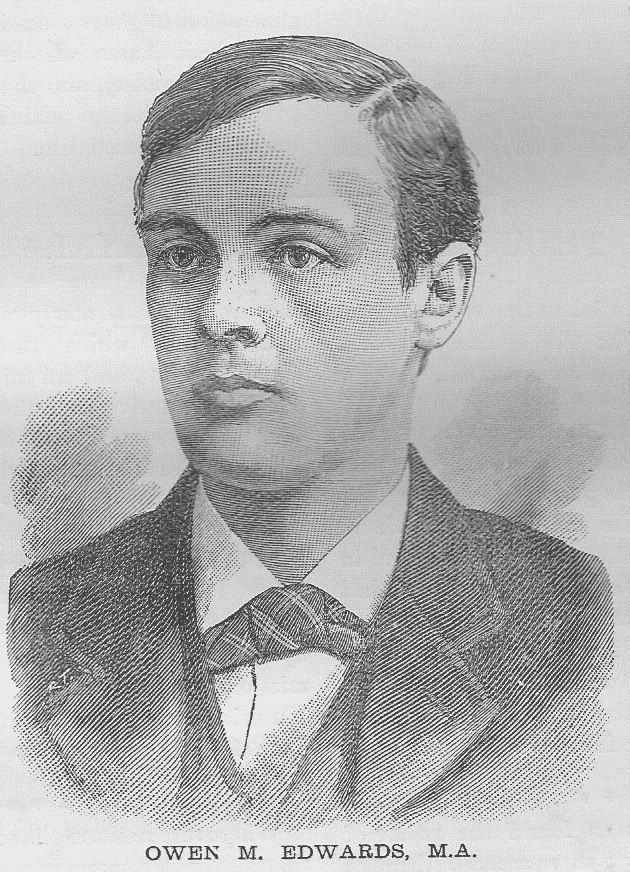

1899 Merionethshire by-election
Party	Candidate	Votes	%	±%
Liberal	Owen Morgan Edwards	Unopposed		
Liberal hold				

=== Elections in the 1900s ===
Osmond Williams

General election 1900: Merioneth
Party	Candidate	Votes	%	±%
Liberal	Osmond Williams	Unopposed		
Liberal hold				

General election 1906: Merioneth
Party	Candidate	Votes	%	±%
Liberal	Osmond Williams	Unopposed		
Liberal hold				

=== Elections in the 1910s ===
General election January 1910: Merioneth
Party	Candidate	Votes	%	±%
Liberal	Henry Haydn Jones	6,065	76.4	N/A
Conservative	Robert John Morris	1,873	23.6	New
Majority		4,192	52.8	N/A
Turnout		7,938	84.8	N/A
Registered electors		9,365		
Liberal hold		Swing	N/A	

General election December 1910: Merioneth
Party	Candidate	Votes	%	±%
Liberal	Henry Haydn Jones	Unopposed		
Liberal hold				

General Election 1914–15:

Another General Election was required to take place before the end of 1915. The political parties had been making preparations for an election to take place and by July 1914, the following candidates had been selected;

- Liberal: Henry Haydn Jones
- Unionist: Sam Thompson

General election 1918: Merioneth
Party	Candidate	Votes	%	±%
Liberal	Henry Haydn Jones	Unopposed		
Liberal hold				

=== Elections in the 1920s ===
General election 1922: Merioneth
Party	Candidate	Votes	%	±%
Liberal	Henry Haydn Jones	9,903	58.3	N/A
Labour	John Jones Roberts	7,070	41.7	New
Majority		2,833	16.6	N/A
Turnout		16,973	77.1	N/A
Liberal hold		Swing	N/A	

General election 1923: Merioneth
Party	Candidate	Votes	%	±%
Liberal	Henry Haydn Jones	11,005	60.5	+2.2
Labour	John Jones Roberts	7,181	39.5	−2.2
Majority		3,824	21.0	+4.4
Turnout		18,186	80.2	+3.1
Liberal hold		Swing	+2.2	

General election 1924: Merioneth
Party	Candidate	Votes	%	±%
Liberal	Henry Haydn Jones	9,228	47.8	−12.7
Labour	John Jones Roberts	6,393	33.1	−6.4
Conservative	Robert Vaughan	3,677	19.1	New
Majority		2,835	14.7	−6.3
Turnout		19,298	83.9	+2.7
Liberal hold		Swing		

General election 1929: Merioneth
Party	Candidate	Votes	%	±%
Liberal	Henry Haydn Jones	11,865	48.3	+0.5
Labour	John Jones Roberts	7,980	32.5	−0.6
Conservative	Charles Phibbs	4,731	19.3	+0.2
Majority		3,885	15.8	+1.1
Turnout		24,576	85.2	+1.3
Liberal hold		Swing	+0.6	

=== Elections in the 1930s ===
General election 1931: Merioneth
Party	Candidate	Votes	%	±%
Liberal	Henry Haydn Jones	9,756	40.8	+7.5
Labour	James Henry Howard	7,807	32.6	+0.1
Conservative	Charles Phibbs	6,372	26.6	+7.3
Majority		1,949	8.1	−7.7
Turnout		23,935	82.6	−2.6
Liberal hold		Swing		

General election 1935: Merioneth
Party	Candidate	Votes	%	±%
Liberal	Henry Haydn Jones	9,466	40.0	−0.8
Labour	Thomas Jones	8,317	35.2	+2.6
Conservative	Charles Phibbs	5,868	24.8	−1.8
Majority		1,149	4.9	−3.2
Turnout		23,651	81.6	−1.0
Liberal hold		Swing		

A General election was due to take place before the end of 1940, but was postponed due to the Second World War. By the Autumn of 1939, the following candidates had been selected to contest this constituency;

- Liberal Party: Henry Haydn Jones
- Labour Party: Thomas Jones

=== Elections in the 1940s ===
General election 1945: Merioneth
Party	Candidate	Votes	%	±%
Liberal	Emrys Roberts	8,495	35.8	−4.2
Labour	Huw Morris Jones	8,383	35.4	+0.2
Conservative	Craig Parry Hughes	4,374	18.5	−6.3
Plaid Cymru	Gwynfor Evans	2,448	10.3	New
Majority		112	0.4	−4.5
Turnout		23,700	82.2	+0.6
Liberal hold		Swing	-2.2	

=== Elections in the 1950s ===
General election 1950: Merioneth
Party	Candidate	Votes	%	±%
Liberal	Emrys Roberts	9,647	38.8	+3.0
Labour	O Parry	8,577	34.5	−0.9
Conservative	John Francis Williams-Wynne	4,374	18.5	0.0
Plaid Cymru	Gwynfor Evans	2,754	11.0	+0.7
Majority		1,070	4.3	+3.9
Turnout		25,352	88.8	+6.6
Liberal hold		Swing		

General election 1951: Merioneth
Party	Candidate	Votes	%	±%
Labour	Thomas Jones	10,505	43.0	+8.5
Liberal	Emrys Roberts	9,457	38.6	−0.2
Conservative	Geraint Morgan	4,505	18.4	−0.1
Majority		1,048	4.4	N/A
Turnout		24,467	87.3	−1.5
Labour gain from Liberal		Swing		

General election 1955: Merioneth
Party	Candidate	Votes	%	±%
Labour	Thomas Jones	9,056	38.3	−4.7
Liberal	Henry Evans Jones	6,374	26.9	−11.7
Plaid Cymru	Gwynfor Evans	5,243	22.1	New
National Liberal	John V Jenkins	3,001	12.7	−5.7
Majority		2,682	11.3	+6.9
Turnout		23,674		
Labour hold		Swing		

General election 1959: Merioneth
Party	Candidate	Votes	%	±%
Labour	Thomas Jones	9,095	40.7	+2.4
Liberal	Ben Jones	8,119	36.3	+9.4
Plaid Cymru	Gwynfor Evans	5,127	23.0	+0.9
Majority		976	4.4	−6.9
Turnout		22,341		
Labour hold		Swing		

=== Elections in the 1960s ===
General election 1964: Merioneth
Party	Candidate	Votes	%	±%
Labour	Thomas Jones	8,420	38.37	
Liberal	Richard O Jones	7,171	32.68	
Plaid Cymru	Elystan Morgan	3,697	16.85	
Conservative	A E Campbell L Jones-Lloyd	2,656	12.10	New
Majority		1,249	5.69	
Turnout		21,944	83.15	
Labour hold		Swing		

General election 1966: Merioneth
Party	Candidate	Votes	%	±%
Labour	William Edwards	9,628	44.17	
Liberal	Edward Gwyn Jones	7,733	35.47	
Plaid Cymru	Ieuan Lewis Jenkins	2,490	11.42	
Conservative	A E Campbell L Jones-Lloyd	1,948	8.94	
Majority		1,895	8.70	
Turnout		21,799	85.84	
Labour hold		Swing		

=== Elections in the 1970s ===
General election 1970: Merioneth
Party	Candidate	Votes	%	±%
Labour	William Edwards	8,861	39.76	
Plaid Cymru	Dafydd Wigley	5,425	24.34	
Liberal	Emlyn Thomas	5,034	22.59	
Conservative	D Elgan H Edwards	2,965	13.30	
Majority		3,436	15.42	
Turnout		22,285	84.24	
Labour hold		Swing		

General election February 1974: Merioneth
Party	Candidate	Votes	%	±%
Plaid Cymru	Dafydd Elis-Thomas	7,823	34.61	
Labour	William Edwards	7,235	32.01	
Liberal	IAE Jones	4,153	18.37	
Conservative	RR Owen	3,392	15.01	
Majority		588	2.60	N/A
Turnout		22,603	85.26	
Plaid Cymru gain from Labour		Swing		

General election October 1974: Merioneth
Party	Candidate	Votes	%	±%
Plaid Cymru	Dafydd Elis-Thomas	9,543	42.49	
Labour	William Edwards	6,951	30.95	
Liberal	Richard O Jones	3,454	15.38	
Conservative	RR Owen	2,509	11.17	
Majority		2,592	11.54	
Turnout		22,457	84.02	
Plaid Cymru hold		Swing		

General election 1979: Merioneth
Party	Candidate	Votes	%	±%
Plaid Cymru	Dafydd Elis-Thomas	9,275	40.8	−1.7
Conservative	Robert Harvey	5,365	23.6	+12.4
Labour	RH Jones	5,332	23.5	−7.4
Liberal	John Parsons	2,752	12.1	−3.3
Majority		3,910	17.2	+5.7
Turnout		22,724	83.4	−0.6
Plaid Cymru hold		Swing		

== Sources ==
- The BBC/ITN Guide to the New Parliamentary Constituencies (Chichester: Parliamentary Research Services, 1983)
- Cobbett's Parliamentary history of England, from the Norman Conquest in 1066 to the year 1803 (London: Thomas Hansard, 1808)
- Matthew Cragoe, Culture, Politics, and National Identity in Wales 1832–1886 (Oxford: Oxford University Press, 2004)
- F W S Craig, British Parliamentary Election Results 1832–1885 (2nd edition, Aldershot: Parliamentary Research Services, 1989)
- F W S Craig, British Parliamentary Election Results 1918–1949 (Glasgow: Political Reference Publications, 1969)
- Jones, Ieuan Gwynedd (1981). Explorations and Explanations. Essays in the Social History of Victorian Wales. Llandysul: Gomer. ISBN 0850886449.
- Lewis Namier & John Brooke, The History of Parliament: The House of Commons 1754-1790 (London: HMSO, 1964)
- J E Neale, The Elizabethan House of Commons (London: Jonathan Cape, 1949)
- Henry Pelling, Social Geography of British Elections 1885–1910 (London: Macmillan, 1967)
- J Holladay Philbin, Parliamentary Representation 1832 – England and Wales (New Haven: Yale University Press, 1965)
- Robert Waller, The Almanac of British Politics (1st edition, London: Croom Helm, 1983)
- Leigh Rayment's Historical List of MPs – Constituencies beginning with "M" (part 2)
