= William Price (Royalist) =

English politician and Royalist colonel

William Price (1619–1691) was a Welsh politician who sat in the House of Commons in two periods between 1640 and 1679. He fought as a Royalist colonel in the English Civil War.

== Biography ==
Price was the elder son of John Price of Rhiwlas and his wife Eleanor Jones, daughter of Sir William Jones of Castle March Carnarvonshire. He entered Christ Church, Oxford, on 27 May 1636 aged 16.

In November 1640, Price was elected Member of Parliament for Merioneth in the Long Parliament. He was a Colonel in Royal Army in Civil War and was disabled from sitting in parliament in 1644. However he retained the family estate under Oliver Cromwell's protectorate.

On the Restoration, Price was nominated as Knight of the Royal Oak having an estate of £1500 per annum. He was elected MP for Merioneth again in 1677 for the Cavalier Parliament and sat until 1679. He became JP for Flintshire in 1680.

Price died in 1691 and was buried in St Asaph Cathedral.

== Family ==
Price married Mary Holland, daughter of David Holland of Kinmel. His grandson was William Price, High Sheriff of two Welsh counties during the 1730s.
