= Thomas Jones, Baron Maelor =

British politician (1898–1984)

Thomas William Jones, Baron Maelor (10 February 1898 – 18 November 1984) was a British Labour politician.

Born into a mining family in Ponciau, Wrexham, Wales, he was educated at Ponciau School before becoming a coal miner at the nearby Bersham Colliery. He later attended Normal College Bangor, Gwynedd and qualified as a teacher. During World War I he was a conscientious objector, but was granted recognition only to serve in the army as a non-combatant. He received a six-month prison sentence by court-martial for refusing to obey orders, on grounds of conscience, which he served at Wormwood Scrubs prison in London; under the Home Office Scheme he was transferred to Knutsford Work Centre, and then Princetown Work Centre in the former Dartmoor prison in Devon.

Jones firstly stood as a Labour Parliamentary candidate in 1935, but was unsuccessful. However, in the 1951 general election he was elected as member of parliament for Merionethshire Westminster constituency, a position he held until 1966. On 13 June 1966 he was given a life peerage as Baron Maelor, of Rhosllannerchrugog in the County of Denbighshire.

Jones was a poet and a member of the Gorsedd of Bards at the National Eisteddfod of Wales and served as President of the International Eisteddfod at Llangollen. Lord Maelor, a lifelong heavy smoker, died in an overnight fire at his home in Ponciau which was thought to have been started by a smouldering cigarette. He was cremated at Pentre Bychan Crematorium, Wrexham.

His brother, Idwal, was member of parliament (Labour) for Wrexham from 1955 to 1970.

Parliament of the United Kingdom
Preceded by Emrys Owain Roberts	Member of Parliament for Merionethshire; 1951 – 1966	Succeeded by William Edwards
