= Owen Morgan Edwards =

Welsh historian, educationalist, and writer (1858–1920)

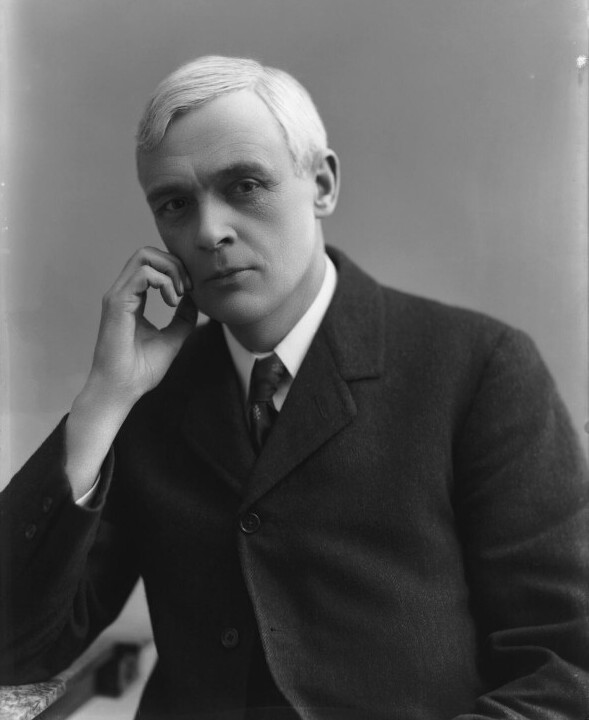
Edwards in 1916

Sir Owen Morgan Edwards (26 December 1858 – 15 May 1920), often known as O. M. Edwards, was a Welsh historian, educationalist and writer.

== Biography ==
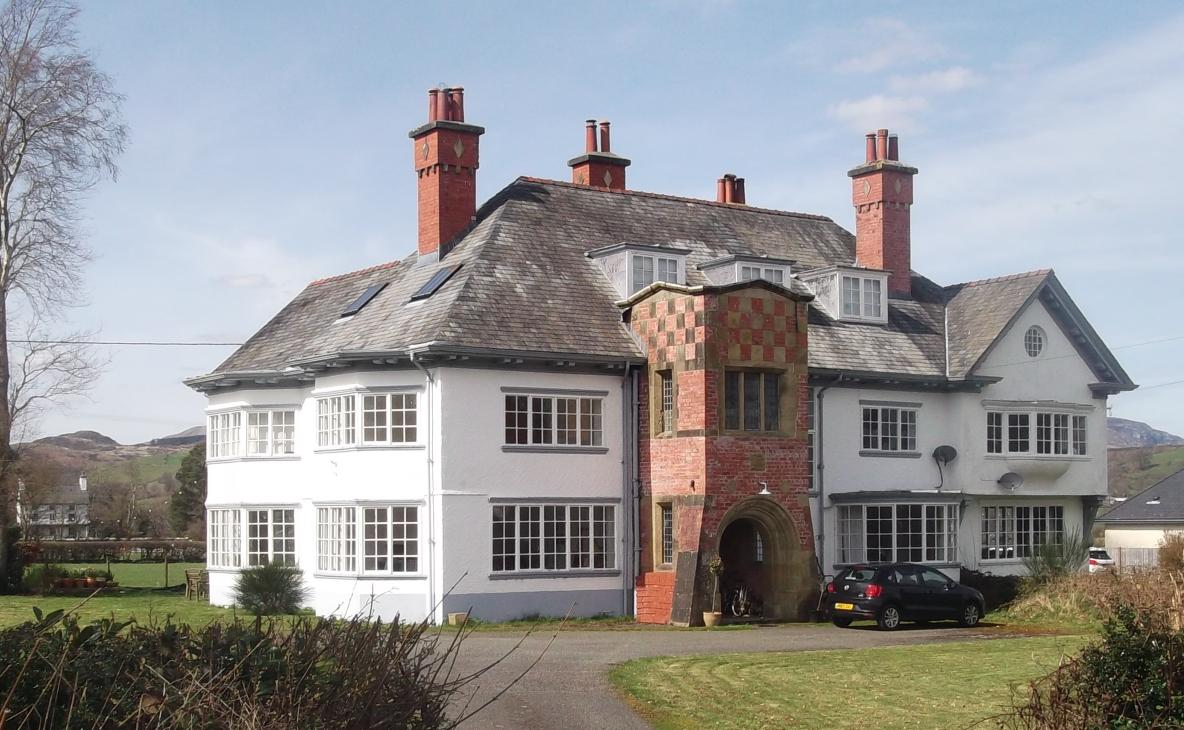
Neuadd Wen, Llanuwchllyn. Built by Edwards as his own residence in 1907.

Owen Edwards was born in Llanuwchllyn near Bala, the eldest son of Owen and Beti Edwards of Coed y Pry in the village. His father died on 27 March 1895. He gives a vivid description of his early education in his autobiography Clych Adgof ("Bells of Remembrance") published in 1906. Llanuwchllyn was then and remains a strongly Welsh-speaking area, but the Welsh Not was in use at the local school and usually found itself round Owen's neck, as a punishment for speaking Welsh.

After studying at Bala and University College of Wales, Aberystwyth, graduating with a pass degree in 1883. He then spent a year at the University of Glasgow studying philosophy before studying at Balliol College, Oxford, from 1884 to 1887, winning all the university's three main prizes for history. The 1891 census for Wales recorded that he was at home with his family at Coed y Pry on census night, and his occupation was 'school teacher of History.' He came under the influence of the Dafydd ap Gwilym Society at Oxford, establishing friendships with other students who later became prominent in Welsh life such as John Morris-Jones and becoming a strong cultural nationalist. He then spent a year on the continent before returning to Oxford, where he was appointed a Fellow of Lincoln College and became tutor in history there and at other colleges. He remained in this position until 1907.

In 1907 he was appointed as the first Chief Inspector of Schools for Wales under the recently established Welsh Education Department. He took the first steps towards ensuring that the Welsh language was taught in the schools of Wales. He came into conflict with the Central Welsh Board because of his conviction that the new intermediate schools were anglicising influences in Wales and his determination to resist this.

He was also a prolific writer, starting and editing the periodical Cymru in 1891 and Cymru'r Plant for children in 1892, intended to arouse interest among the people of Wales in their own language and history. An English-language version of Cymru, Wales (1901), was less successful. He wrote a number of books on Welsh history, notably Cartrefi Cymru ("Welsh Homes") which describes visits to the homes of a number of important historical figures, and published the works of other writers in a series of Welsh classics Cyfres y Fil ("The Series of a Thousand" - in 37 volumes, so-called because the author sought 1,000 subscribers, through the periodical Cymru).

Edwards built Neuadd Wen ("White Hall") in his native Llanuwchllyn in 1907.

Edwards was elected as a Liberal Member of Parliament for Merionethshire following the premature death of T. E. Ellis MP in April 1899. He did not enjoy parliamentary life and did not seek re-election in 1900. He was knighted in 1916 and awarded the degree of D.Litt. by the University of Wales in 1918. Edwards died at Llanuwchllyn in 1920, his wife Ellen having died the previous year. His first son died at the age of five. His second son, Ifan ab Owen Edwards, founded Urdd Gobaith Cymru ("The Welsh League of Youth"). His only daughter Hâf married Sir David Hughes Parry.

== Bibliography ==
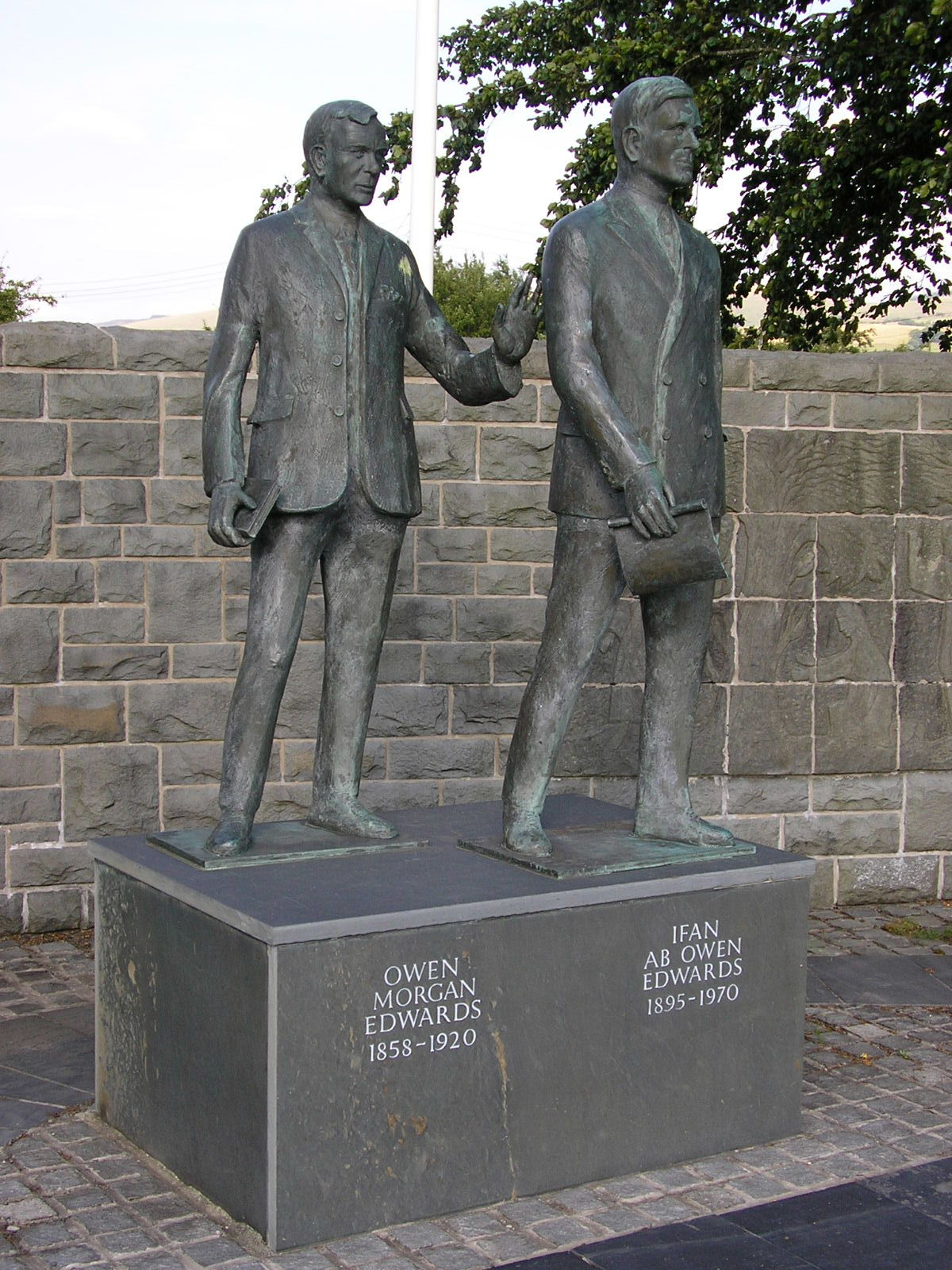
Statues of Edwards and his son Ifan ab Owen Edwards in Llanuwchllyn, by Jonah Jones, unveiled 1972

=== Books ===
- Clych Atgof (1906). Reminiscences of the Bala area.
- O'r Bala i Geneva (1889). Travel.
- Ystraeon o Hanes Cymru (1894). Tales from Welsh history.
- Hanes Cymru (1895, 1899). History of Wales.
- Cartrefi Cymru (1896). Famous Welsh homes.
- Wales (1901) (T. Fisher Unwin)
- A Short History of Wales (1906)
- Llyfr Del (1906). For children.
- Hwiangerddi (1911). For children.
- Llyfr Nest (1913). For children.
- Tro yn Llydaw. Travels in Brittany.
- Tro yn y Wlad (1920). Welsh travel sketches.

=== Critical studies ===
- W. J. Gruffydd, Owen Morgan Edwards (Aberystwyth, 1937)
- Gwilym Arthur Jones, Bywyd a Gwaith Owen Morgan Edwards (1958)
- Meic Stephens (ed.) Companion to Welsh literature (University of Wales Press)

Parliament of the United Kingdom
Preceded by T. E. Ellis	Member of Parliament for Merioneth; 1899 – 1900	Succeeded by Sir Osmond Williams
