= Samuel Holland (politician) =

Welsh politician (1803–1892)

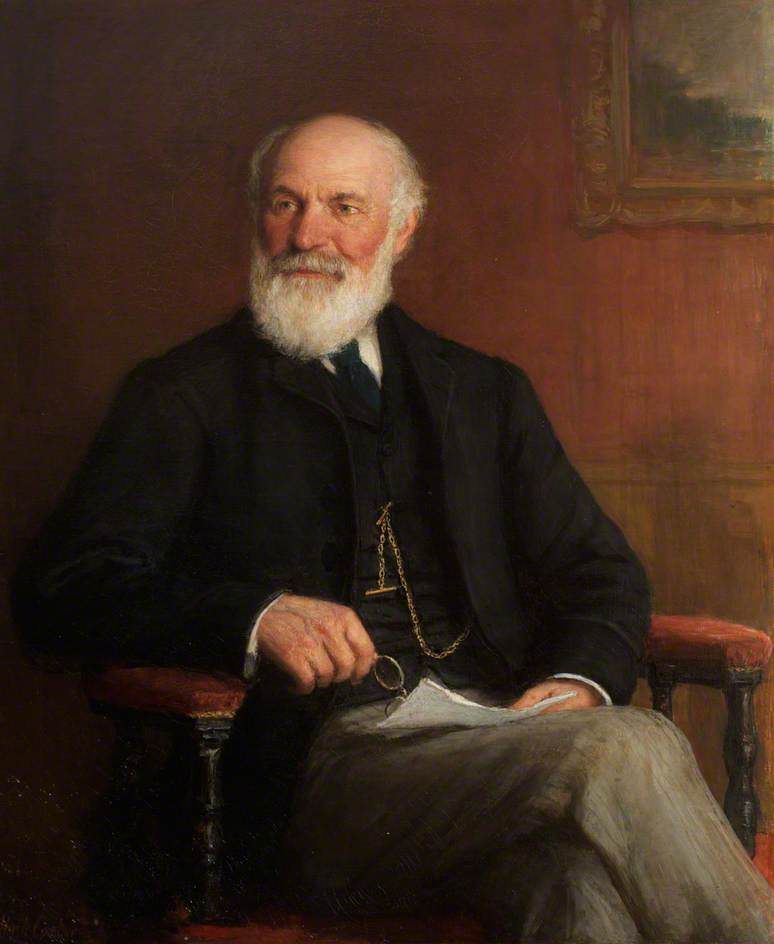
- Samuel Holland, Esq., of Caerdeon (1803–1892) by Hugh Carter
- Born: 17 October 1803; Liverpool, England
- Died: 27 December 1892 (aged 89)
- Occupation: Politician

Samuel Holland (17 October 1803 – 27 December 1892) was a Welsh Liberal Party politician.

== Biography ==
The son of Samuel, a Liverpool merchant, and Katherine Holland, Samuel Holland was born in Duke Street, Liverpool. He was educated in England and Germany and joined his father's company as an office boy.

At eighteen, Holland was made manager of the Rhiwbryfdir quarry near Blaenau Ffestiniog - later part of the Oakeley quarry. He spoke no Welsh so a Welsh servant, Mary Wynn, who spoke no English, was employed to teach him. He conceived the narrow-gauge Ffestiniog Railway from Blaenau Ffestiniog to Porthmadog which carried slates from his quarry to the harbour.

Holland was appointed High Sheriff of Merionethshire for 1862. He served as Liberal Member of Parliament (MP) for Merioneth from 1870 to 1885.

In 1875 Holland was active in setting up the Dr Williams' School in Dolgellau. He became the first chairman of the school's Board of Governors. In 1874, he was a constable of Harlech Castle, chairman of the Penrhyndeudraeth magistrates and chairman of the Festiniog Board of Guardians. He bought the Caerdeon estate, near Barmouth, Merionethshire, in 1874.

His widow, Catherine Jane Holland (née Burt), died on 16 August 1924, aged 80.

== See also ==
- St Philip's Church, Caerdeon

Parliament of the United Kingdom
Preceded by David Williams	Member of Parliament for Merioneth; 1870–1885	Succeeded by Henry Robertson
