= John Jones Maesygarnedd =

Welsh Parliamentary soldier and regicide

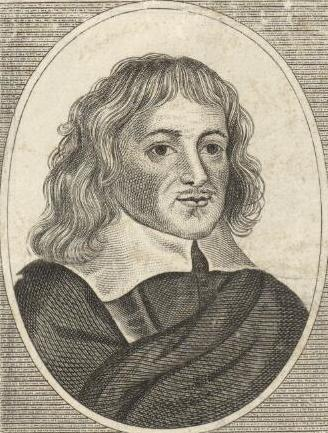
- Born: John Jones c. 1597; Maesygarnedd, Llanbedr, Merionethshire, Wales
- Died: 17 October 1660 Charing Cross, London
- Allegiance: Parliamentarian

John Jones Maesygarnedd (c. 1597 – 17 October 1660) was a Welsh military leader and politician, known as one of the regicides of King Charles I following the English Civil War. A brother-in-law of Oliver Cromwell, Jones was a Parliamentarian and an avid Republican at a time when most of Wales was Royalist, and became one of 57 commissioners that signed the death warrant authorising the execution of Charles I following his trial. After the Restoration of the monarchy, Jones was one of the few excluded from the general amnesty in the Indemnity and Oblivion Act, and was tried, found guilty, then hanged, drawn and quartered at Charing Cross.

== Biography ==
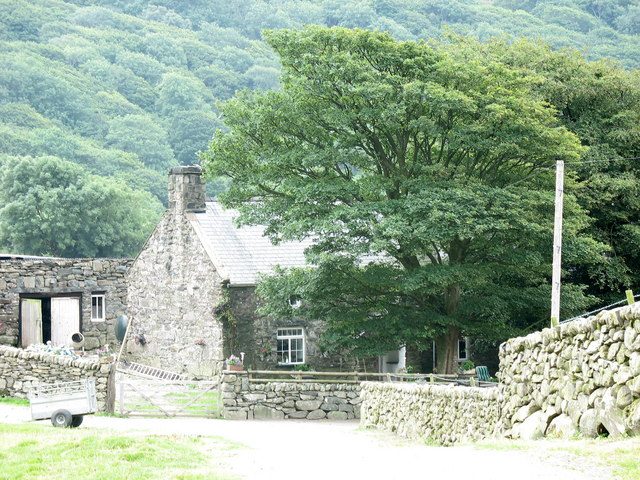
Maesygarnedd, Llanbedr, Merionethshire, in 2006

John Jones was born in about 1597, the son of Thomas ab John or Jones and Ellen, daughter of Robert Wynn ap Jevan esq. of Taltreuddyn, at Maes-y-Garnedd (or Maesygarnedd), Llanbedr in Merionethshire, Wales. Jones is often surnamed as Maesygarnedd, after the location of his residence in North Wales, and spoke Welsh with his family. During the English Civil War, Jones served in the Parliamentarian forces in Wales, and was described as a colonel in 1646 while negotiating the surrender of Anglesey in June 1646. In 1648, Jones helped to suppress Sir John Owen's rising, and was thanked by the House of Commons for his share in the reconquest of Anglesey, and was voted £2,000 on account of his arrears of pay. He was returned to the Long Parliament in about 1647 for Merionethshire.

Following the end of the war, Jones was selected as one of the judges of King Charles I, and attended the trial with great regularity. Jones was the forty-second signatory of the fifty-seven commissioners that signed the death warrant that effectively authorised the execution of the King. After execution, Jones was elected a member of the first two Councils of State of the Commonwealth of England In July 1650, Jones was voted one of the commissioners to assist the Lord Deputy in the government of Ireland, and was reappointed for two years longer on 24 August 1652. His colleague, Edmund Ludlow, described him as "discharging his trust with great diligence, ability, and integrity, in providing for the happiness of that country, and bringing to justice those who had been concerned in the murders of English Protestants".

Jones was a strong Republican, and was greatly dissatisfied at Oliver Cromwell's assumption of the Protectorate. Henry Cromwell describes him as "endeavouring to render the government unacceptable", but "more cunning and close" in his opposition than Ludlow. He was accordingly set aside, and when in March 1656, there was a rumour that Jones was to be again employed in the Irish government, Henry Cromwell remonstrated with Thurloe against the choice, asserting that he was not only factious and disaffected, but "had acted very corruptly in his place". By this time a marriage had been arranged between Jones and Oliver Cromwell's sister, Catherine, widow of Roger Whitstone, "When I writ to you about Colonel Jones", explained Henry Cromwell. "I did not know that he was likely to be my uncle. Perhaps that may serve to oblige him to faithfulness to his highness and government".

In the First Protectorate Parliament (1656), Jones returned for the counties of Merionethshire and Denbighshire, choosing to sit for Merionethshire. In the Second Narrative of the late Parliament, Jones is described as originally "one of good principles for common justice and freedom ... lately married the Protector's sister, by which means he might have become a great man indeed, did not something stick which he cannot well get down. He is not thorough-paced for the court proceedings, nor is his conscience fully hardened against the good old cause". Jones was summoned to Oliver Cromwell's Other House in December 1657, but held no office except that of governor of the Isle of Anglesey. On 2 June 1657, Parliament voted giving Jones lands in Ireland to the value of £3,000, for arrears of pay amounting to that sum. He was still so far trusted by the republicans that on 7 May 1659, Jones was appointed one of the Committee of Safety, and on 14 May one of the Council of State. An act was passed making Jones and others commissioners for the government of Ireland on 7 July, and Jones landed in Ireland with Ludlow in July 1659. When Ludlow returned to England in October, he selected Jones to command the Irish forces during his absence. To Ludlow's disgust, Jones and most of the Irish officers supported John Lambert and the army in their quarrel with parliament. When Ludlow expostulated Jones made the excuse that he acted at the "incessant importunity of others", and begged Ludlow to return and ease him of the burden of his command. On 13 December 1659, however, Colonels John Bridges, Theophilus Jones, and other officers of George Monck's party seized Dublin Castle and arrested Jones. An impeachment of high treason against Jones and his colleagues (Ludlow, Corbet, and Thomlinson) was presented to Parliament on 19 January 1660. The main charge was that Jones had "openly and publicly owned that treacherous and traitorous act of part of the army in England in their unjust force put upon the parliament". Jones was summoned before the Council of State, but was released on an agreement not to disturb the existing government.

=== Restoration of the monarchy ===
In 1660, the Restoration of the monarchy under Charles II, the son of King Charles I, exposed Jones to certain ruin. As a politically active senior member of the republican party, who had married into Oliver Cromwell's family, was an opponent of Monck's party, and a signatory of Charles I's death warrant, Jones became a prime target of Charles II and his supporters seeking revenge. However, Jones seems to have been unaware of the danger he was in, making no attempt to flee, and was arrested on 2 June 1660, as he was quietly walking in Finsbury, and was committed to the Tower of London. On 4 June, the House of Commons excepted him from the Indemnity and Oblivion Act, and he was tried on 12 October the same year. Jones confessed that he had sat among the King's judges, made no attempt to plead any point of law, and was sentenced to death. On 17 October 1660, Jones was executed by being hanged, drawn and quartered together with Adrian Scrope, and reportedly died with great courage and dignity.

== Family ==
Jones married twice. His first marriage was before 1639 to Margaret Edwards (died Ireland 19 November 1651) with whom he had eight children, but only one, a son, survived him. Margaret was a devoted follower of the Puritan preacher Morgan Llwyd.

In 1656 Jones married again. His second wife was Catherine Whitstone (baptised on 7 February 1597), the third sister of Oliver Cromwell, and the widow of Roger Whitstone, a Parliamentary army officer who had campaigned in the Low Countries. She had three sons and two daughters from her prior marriage. Catherine received an annual settlement of £300 from the estate of her former husband to which Oliver Cromwell added an annuity of £150. She and Jones had no children. Her husband opposed Richard Cromwell when he was Protector, and Richard stopped her annuity. From a letter of Catherine's that was published in the 19th century, it seems that she had Royalist sympathies as she disapproved of the execution of Charles I.

After Jones's execution, his son and heir was allowed to retain the lands Jones had held before 1646, but the rest either returned to the Crown (if they had been Crown lands before the Civil War) or were forfeited. His forfeited estates in Wales went to the Duke of York (the future James II of England), while those in Ireland went to Arthur Annesley, 1st Earl of Anglesey.
