= Rhiwlas, Llandderfel =

Grade II registered historic park and garden in Gwynedd, Wales

Rhiwlas
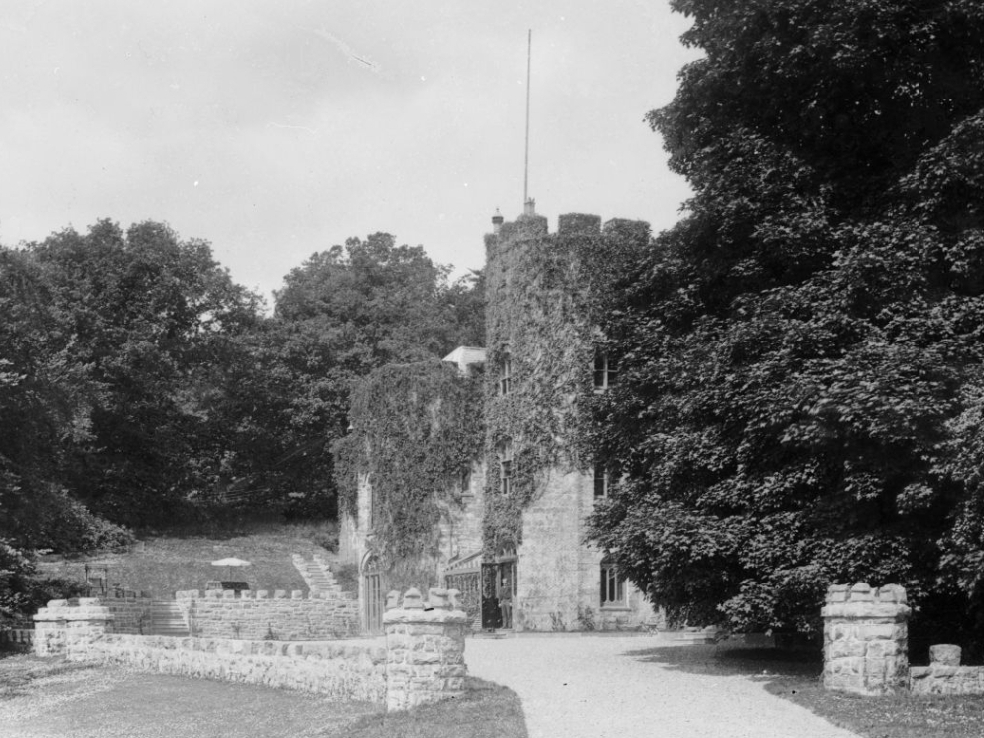
- The 19th-century Rhiwlas Hall (now demolished), photographed by John Thomas c. 1885

- Location within Gwynedd
- 52.9201°N 3.5981°W
- Type: House and garden
- Location: Bala

Site notes
- Architect: Clough Williams-Ellis
- Governing body: Privately owned

Cadw/ICOMOS Register of Parks and Gardens of Special Historic Interest in Wales
- Official name: Rhiwlas
- Designated: 1 February 2022
- Reference no.: PGW(Gd)25(GWY)

Listed Building – Grade II
- Official name: Quadrangular Stable Complex at Rhiwlas, including Y Stablau and Stablau Isa
- Designated: 31 January 2001
- Reference no.: 24621

Listed Building – Grade II
- Official name: Game Larder at Rhiwlas
- Designated: 31 January 2001
- Reference no.: 24622

Listed Building – Grade II
- Official name: Ice House at Rhiwlas
- Designated: 31 January 2001
- Reference no.: 24625

Listed Building – Grade II
- Official name: Gateway and Screen Walls to Rhiwlas
- Designated: 31 January 2001
- Reference no.: 24597

Rhiwlas is an estate about 1 km (0.62 mi) to the north of the town of Bala, Gwynedd, Wales. It has been in the possession of the Price family for over four centuries. Rhiwlas Hall, a Regency extravaganza, was demolished in the 1950s and replaced by a smaller house designed by Clough Williams-Ellis. Many of the estate buildings remain and are listed structures, and the hall's gardens and landscaped park, landscaped by William Emes, are listed at Grade II on the Cadw/ICOMOS Register of Parks and Gardens of Special Historic Interest in Wales.

== History and architecture ==
The Price family have owned the Rhiwlas estate since at least the 1540s. (Note: Richard Haslam, Julian Orbach and Adam Voelcker, in their 2009 volume, Gwynedd, date the founding of the estate to Rhys Fawr ap Maredudd (Sir Rhys ap Meredith), who served as Henry VII's standard-bearer at the Battle of Bosworth Field in 1485 and who subsequently received the Rhiwlas lands from the king.) Richard John Lloyd Price (1843–1923) was a noted sportsman, who hosted Britain's first sheepdog trials at Rhiwlas in 1873. Robin Price, the 15th generation of his family to farm at Rhiwlas, died in 2016. The estate remains privately owned by the Price family.

The 19th-century Rhiwlas Hall was a large building constructed in 1809. RCAHMW describes it as being "three-storeyed and castellated with turrets", while Cadw considers it to have been an "enormous rambling mansion". The architect is unknown. Thomas Rickman undertook some work on the estate at the time of the reconstruction, including the entrance gate, but Pevsner does not ascribe the house to him. The hall was demolished in 1954, having suffered both wartime requisition and dry rot. The replacement, designed by Clough Williams-Ellis, is considered by Richard Haslam, Julian Orbach and Adam Voelcker, writing in their 2009 volume Gwynedd in the Pevsner Buildings of Wales series, to be among his best work.

The gardens were designed by William Emes and are designated Grade II on the Cadw/ICOMOS Register of Parks and Gardens of Special Historic Interest in Wales.

A number of historic estate buildings survive and are listed, all at Grade II. These include the game larder, the ice house, the castellated stables, and the main gateway and estate walls.

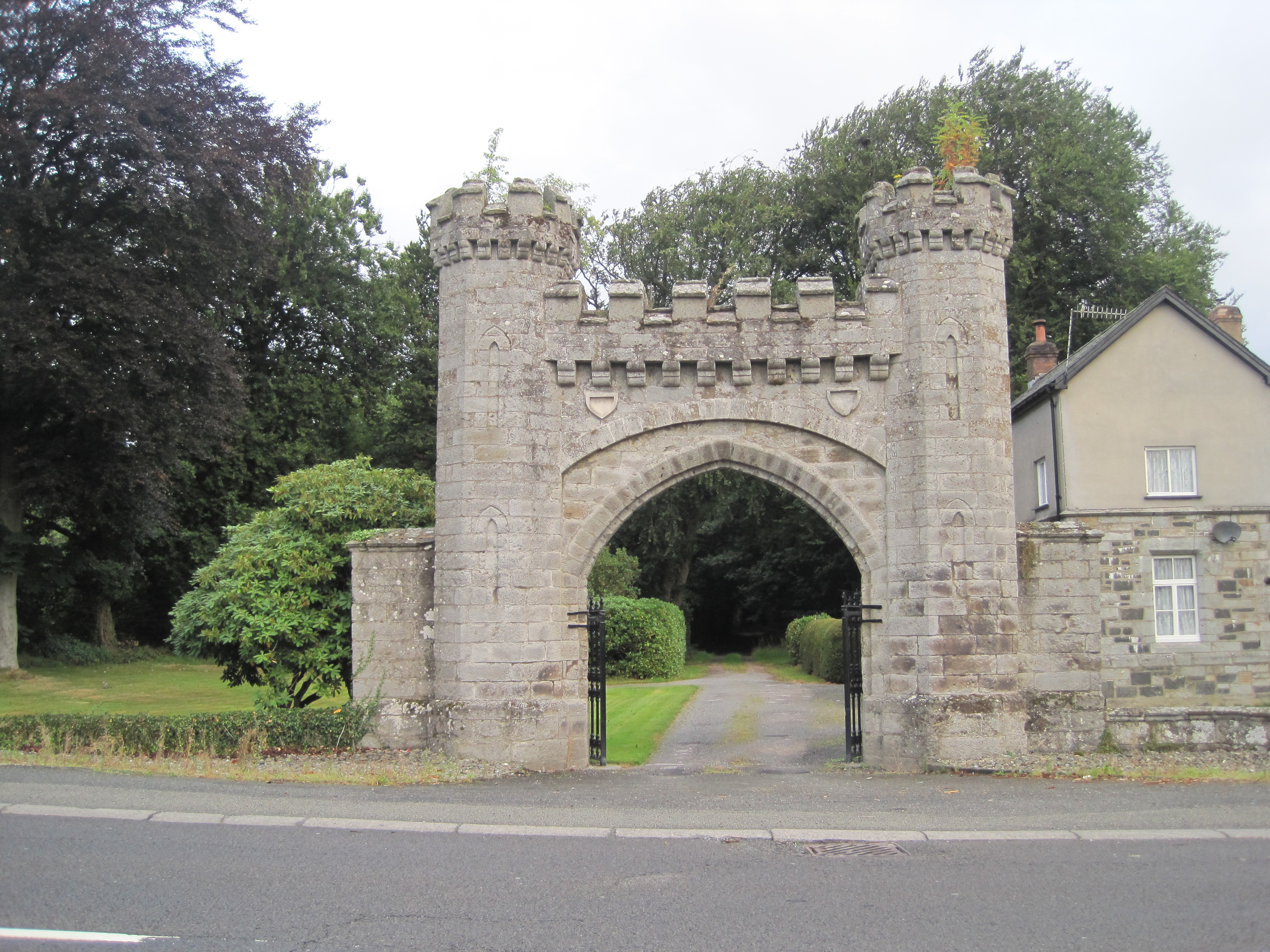
The gateway to Rhiwlas Hall, designed by Thomas Rickman and erected in 1813

== Sources ==
- Haslam, Richard; Orbach, Julian; Voelcker, Adam (2009). Gwynedd. The Buildings of Wales. New Haven and London: Yale University Press. ISBN 978-0-300-14169-6. OCLC 1023292902.
