= Stan Jones =

Stan or Stanley Jones may refer to:

- Stan Jones (Libertarian politician) (born 1943), American Libertarian politician and famous sufferer of argyria
- Stan Jones (Indiana politician) (1949–2017), American educator and politician
- Stan Jones (songwriter) (1914–1963), American songwriter of Western music
- Stan Jones (racing driver) (1923–1973), winner of the 1959 Australian Grand Prix and father of Formula 1 World Champion, Alan Jones
- G. Stanley Jones (1926–1998), Canadian-born American actor
- Stan Jones (American football) (1931–2010), American football player and Hall of Fame member
- Stan Jones (Australian rules footballer) (1908–1972), Australian footballer
- Stan Jones (athlete) (1914–2006), British Olympic runner
- Stan Jones (English footballer) (born 1938), English football defender
- Stan Jones (mystery writer) (born 1947), American mystery writer
- E. Stanley Jones (1884–1973), Christian missionary
- Stanley Jones (cyclist) (1888–1962), British Olympic cyclist
- Stan Jones (cyclist) (1922–1995), British cyclist
- Stanley Jones (judge) (born 1941), Australian judge
- Stan Jones (painter) (1930–2012), Welsh watercolour artist
- Stanley Wilson Jones (1888–1962), colonial administrator

== See also ==
- Aiyana Mo'Nay Stanley-Jones (2002–2010), shooting victim of the Detroit Police Department, see killing of Aiyana Jones
