= Noel Lloyd =

Welsh academic (1946–2019)

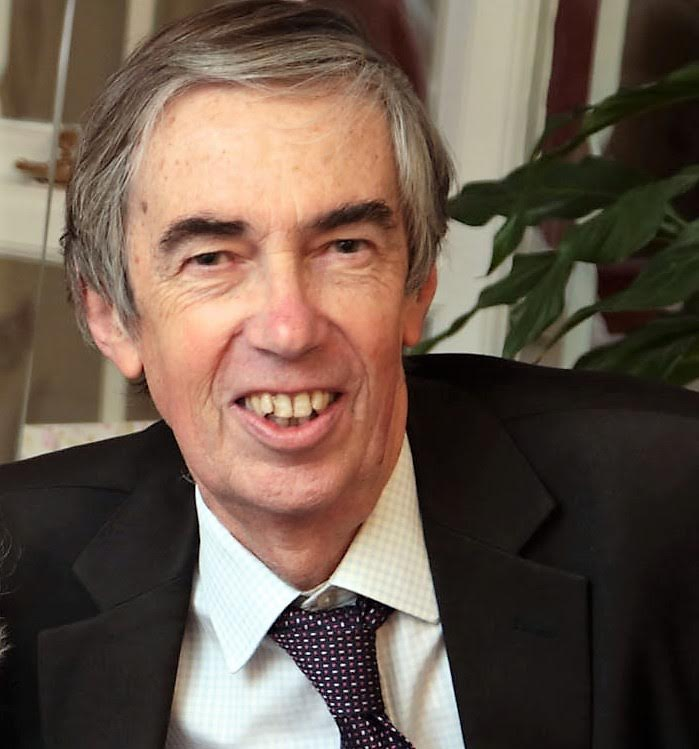
- Died: 7 June 2019
- Alma mater: University of Cambridge
- Occupation: Vice-chancellor, mathematician, university teacher
- Employer: Aberystwyth University
- Awards: Commander of the Order of the British Empire; Fellow of the Learned Society of Wales (2011)

Noel Lloyd CBE, FLSW (26 December 1946 – 7 June 2019) was a Welsh academic, who served as Vice-Chancellor of Aberystwyth University from 2004 to his retirement in 2011.

== Biography ==
Noel Lloyd began his academic career at the University of Cambridge, moving to Aberystwyth University in 1975 and subsequently becoming Professor of Mathematics, Dean of Science, Pro Vice-Chancellor and, from 1999 to 2004, Registrar and Secretary. He was awarded a CBE in the Birthday Honours List in 2010 for services to Higher Education in Wales. On his retirement in 2011, he was elected to the Learned Society of Wales. He was admitted as an Honorary Member of the Gorsedd in 2012. Lloyd was one of the independent members of the Commission on Devolution in Wales chaired by Sir Paul Silk (the Silk Commission) - whose reports were submitted to the UK Government in 2012 and 2014.

He was a Judicial Appointments Commissioner from 2012 until the time of his death.

He was a member of the board of Jisc from 2012 to 2014 and chair of Fair Trade Wales from 2011 to 2017. He also chaired High Performance Computing Wales (a collaborative venture involving all the universities in Wales).

From 2008 to 2011, Lloyd was chair of Higher Education Wales (now Universities Wales) and a Vice-President of Universities UK. He served on the boards of several UK-wide bodies.

He graduated in Mathematics from the University of Cambridge, completed his PhD there and was a Research Fellow at St John’s College. His research interests are in Nonlinear Systems, and he wrote numerous papers on Nonlinear Differential Equations. He was a Distinguished Research Professor at Aberystwyth University from 2011 to 2016.

He was an elder in Capel y Morfa, Aberystwyth, having been church secretary from 1989 to 2004. He was chair of the Church and Society Department of the Presbyterian Church of Wales. He held the Fellowship Diploma of Trinity College of Music, London.

At the time of his death, he left a wife, Dilys, two children and two grandchildren.
