= John Isaac =

John or Jon Isaac may refer to:

- John Isaac (cricketer) (1880–1915), English cricketer
- John Isaac (photographer), Indian-born photographer and author based in New York City
- Jon Isaac or Jonathan Isaac (born 1997), American basketball player
- John Noel Laughton Isaac, a British solicitor and the first British serviceman to die during World War Two

== See also ==
- John Isaacs (disambiguation)
- Isaac John (born 1988), former rugby league footballer
