= Dinas Powys =

Town in the Vale of Glamorgan, Wales

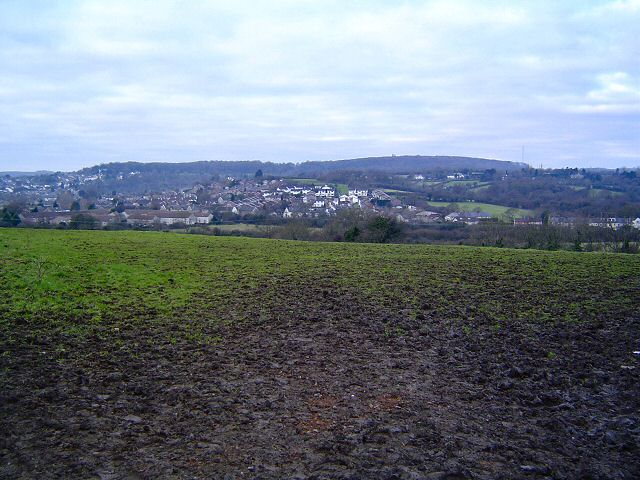
- A distant view of Dinas Powys

- Location within the Vale of Glamorgan
- Population: 7,490 (2011)
- OS grid reference: ST157711
- Principal area: Vale of Glamorgan
- Preserved county: South Glamorgan
- Country: Wales
- Sovereign state: United Kingdom
- Post town: DINAS POWYS
- Postcode district: CF64
- Dialling code: 029
- Police: South Wales
- Fire: South Wales
- Ambulance: Welsh
- UK Parliament: Cardiff South and Penarth
- Senedd Cymru – Welsh Parliament: Vale of Glamorgan
- List of places UK Wales Vale of Glamorgan 51.4331°N 3.2134°W Map of the community

Dinas Powys (Welsh pronunciation: [ˈdinas ˈpɔwɪs]) is a town and community in the Vale of Glamorgan, South Wales. It lies 5.6 miles (9.0 km) south-west of the centre of Cardiff, making it a popular dormitory village for city commuters; it neighbours the larger town of Penarth.

Although several housing developments have been added since the late 20th century, the old centre of Dinas Powys maintains a traditional, almost rural character. It has a village common and small independent shops, pubs, restaurants and community facilities. Garages, small supermarkets, a pharmacy and a veterinary practice can be found in other parts of the town.

According to recent electoral rolls, the population is in the region of 8,800, making Dinas Powys the fifth largest settlement in the Vale of Glamorgan.

== Toponymy ==
Its name means "fort of the provincial place" and refers to the Iron Age hillfort which overlooks the village.

== History ==
=== The Neolithic and the Middle Ages ===
The Dinas Powys area has been populated since prehistoric times. The most ancient artefact found in the area is a Neolithic Stone Age axe-head, discovered by P.W. Brooks in 1949 and now displayed in the National Museum Cardiff. The hillfort was, in its time, considered to have great status and wealth. In the age of Celtic Christianity, residents of Dinas Powys had use of day-to-day objects from Bordeaux, Athens and Alexandria.

The village has substantial remains of an early medieval castle, and the adjacent Cwm George was the site of the Celtic hillfort from which the village takes its name. The hillfort site was excavated by Leslie Alcock of University College, Cardiff between 1953 and 1958 and was found to contain evidence of major wooden structures and a large quantity of high-status metalwork and jewellery. There were also glass items and imported pottery dating from the sub-Roman period of between the 5th and 7th centuries. Alcock dated the defence structures at Dinas Powys as from the Norman period, but later archaeologists and scholars have dated them to the early medieval period.

The castle was originally the seat of a Norman noble called Baron de Sumeri or Sumery, but the structure went into decline around 1322 when the de Sumeri male family line came to an end.

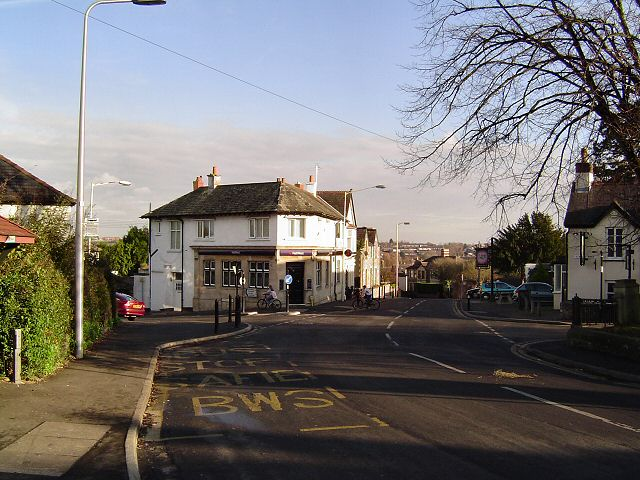
Downtown Dinas Powys

In the 11th century, Dinas Powys was under the control of Sir Reginald de Sully, one of the Twelve Knights of Glamorgan. In 1591, Sir Edward Mansel of Margam wrote his historical document The Winning of Glamorgan and said:

To Sir Reginald de Sully he (Sir Robert Fitz Haymon) gave the castle and town to be called Sully with the Manor of it, and the Manors of St Andrews and Dinas Powys for his Granary and provisions. This Sir Reginald bestowed much land in fee frankliege to his men and came to be a man of wealth and fame. He had at Sully besides his Castle a fair Manor house built after a new manner, where he did live the most of his time, which house as well as the Castle was broke down by Owain Glendowr

Mansel also records:

The Lordship of Llantwit is described as so fertile that as Glamorgan was called the Garden of Wales was this Lordship called the Garden of Glamorgan ... and it is the flower of all the Country ... and it was very full of goodly villages and Courtly houses, most of them still in remaining. The Lord had in this Lordship a noble Castle at Dinas Powys and one at Barry, with his Court house of Llantwit and Grange house of Boverton, so that in the whole it is a most Goodly Country.

Dinas Powys was included in the original medieval Welsh political sub-division called the Cantref Brenhinol (the Royal Hundred); this later became the commote known as the Hundred of Dinas Powys, which also encompassed St Andrews Major, Michaelston-le-Pit, Westra, Penarth, Cogan, Sully, Lavernock and Llandough.

=== Rapid expansion in 19th century ===
By 1833, Dinas Powys barely existed. The nearby St Andrews Major was at the time substantially larger, but together their population was still only 474 in total.

The village's population remained almost static at about 300–400 people until the second half of the 19th century, when there was an influx into the community, including a large contingent from the West Country. The growth of the coal industry saw the first passenger train arrive in Dinas Powys on 20 December 1898, and thereafter the population increased rapidly. The new rail link was laid at the bottom end of the Dinas Powys valley and provided a rapid connection to new docks built in Cardiff, Barry and Penarth to handle the expanding coal trade from the South Wales Valleys. At that time the only features below St Andrews Major were the small hamlet of Dinas Powys, the rail line, Cadoxton Brook and a number of small farms.

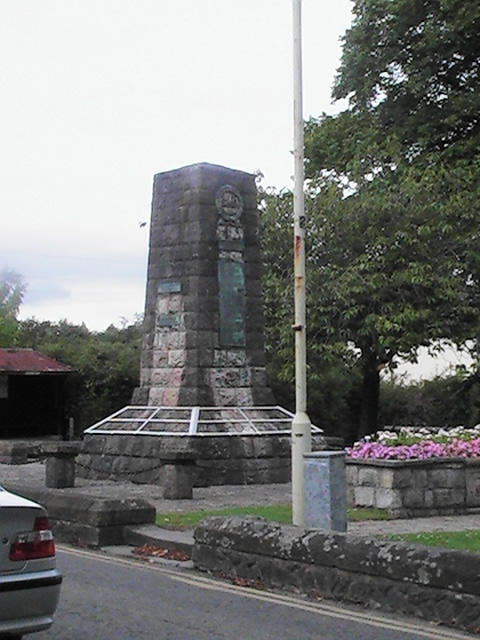
War memorial on the Twyn

The new railway link provided far better communication and transport to the area, making it a more attractive residential prospect, and many workers from Barry and Cardiff moved in. By 1891, the village population had more than doubled to 1,149; ten years later, it was over 2,000. Dinas Powys expanded in two ways: from the railway link towards St. Andrew's Major many imposing houses were built, such as Garnhill House; while along the railway, near the current area of Eastbrook, was new housing of more modest proportions.

A few years after the railway was constructed, the main Cardiff Road was developed over the previous unmetalled trackway that followed the route of the railway line. This led to a further burst of population growth and house building.

=== 20th century ===
A corner of the village common land was sold to the Barry Docks and Railway Company for £160. The then lord of the manor and ex-military survivor of the First World War, Major General Henry Lee, donated an additional sum of £30 and the combined fund was used to upgrade the small green in the centre of the village in 1935, known locally as the Twyn, with a war memorial.

== Geography ==
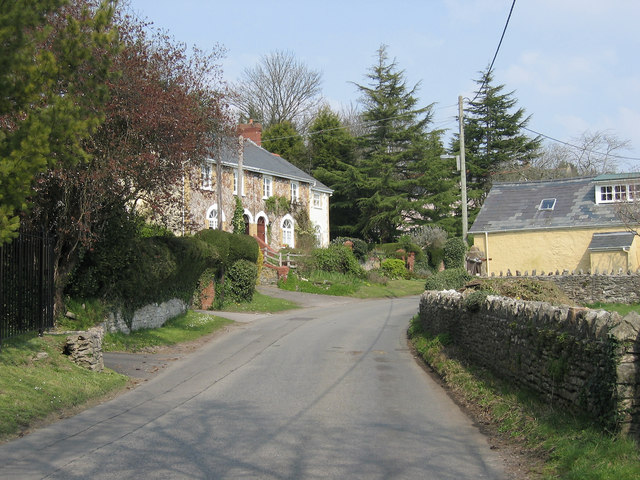
The Westra

Dinas Powys is spread across the full width of a wooded valley, with the Cadoxton River running in the valley.

The surrounding soils are mostly a strong, brown, dry earth, useful for arable farming; the growing of various grains contributed to the area being a mostly farming community until the modern era. The substratum under the whole area is a limestone that was likely laid down under a warm ocean in the distant past.

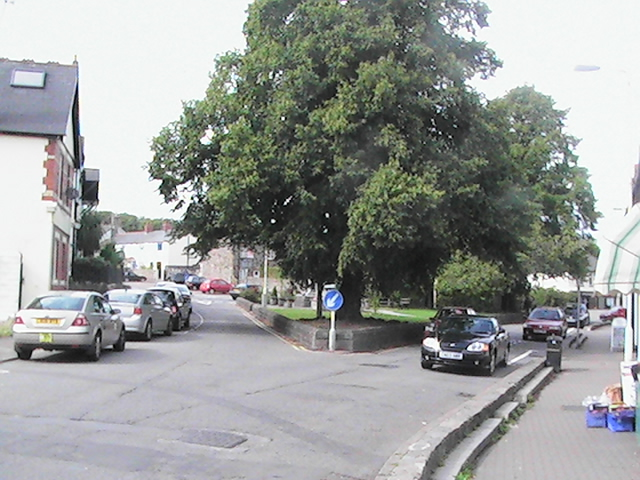
The village centre

The village has not been able to spread northwards because of golf courses and protected woodlands between Dinas Powys and Michaelston-le-Pit; the freeholders of Cwrt-yr-Ala Estate prevented the two from merging. More recent housing development has taken place in a linear fashion either side of the main Cardiff road and in the direction of Cadoxton and Barry. Cwm George and Cwrt-yr-Ala are woodlands in the area.

Maps over the last hundred years show that Penarth and Dinas Powys have spread and grown closer together. In many places, the two communities are only separated by a few hundred yards and a couple of fields; however, no direct road connections have been added, entailing a car journey of several miles via Llandough. The only existing direct road is the medieval, winding single-track Cross Common Road. Another traditional lane crossing, which existed between the current site of the Tesco Express mini-supermarket and the Erw Delyn school at Redlands Heights, Penarth, was closed to through traffic following extensions to the Murch estate in the 1970s.

According to the Environment Agency, in the floods of October 1998, six properties at Dinas Powys were affected. This was caused by the floodwater overtopping the banks of the Cadoxton River (among others), restrictions to flow in channels and surcharging of drains.

== Governance ==
The community of Dinas Powys (which includes St Andrews Major and Westra) elects a community council. Uniquely for this part of Wales, the council was dominated by the Welsh nationalist party Plaid Cymru for over two decades. More recently, this dominance has reduced slightly. In May 2008, the Conservative Party won four additional seats on the community council, all at the expense of Plaid Cymru, including the defeat of Chris Franks.

An electoral ward of the same name exists, for elections to Vale of Glamorgan Council. This ward mainly covers Dinas Powys but also stretches north to Michaelston. The total population of the ward at the 2011 census was 7,799. Until May 2017, the ward was represented by three Plaid Cymru councillors and an independent. In the 2017 elections, all four seats were won by the Conservatives (Vince Driscoll, Andy Robertson, Rob Crowley and Steve Griffiths). The Conservatives also gained seats at Plaid Cymru's expense on the community council.

Dinas Powys lies within the Cardiff South and Penarth parliamentary constituency and is currently represented in the UK Parliament by the Labour MP Stephen Doughty.

The Senedd constituency of Vale of Glamorgan is represented by Jane Hutt of Welsh Labour.

== Demography ==
The 2001 UK Census recorded the population of Dinas Powys as 8,512; in 2011, the number had fallen to 7,490. However, electoral roll information in 2012 indicated that the population was 8,790.

There are few major employers in the village. The majority of the working population commutes to Cardiff, Penarth and Barry.

== Landmarks ==
Local landmarks include Dinas Powys Castle, the village common and the war memorial on the village green.

Garnhill House (and Estate) is a Grade II listed building with terraced gardens exhibited at the Royal Academy in 1904, and has been occupied by the Green family for well over 100 years.

The Mount, a late Georgian villa, is another Grade II listed building. It was originally a farmhouse called Mount Pleasant and was occupied by the Hurst family, who held the manor of Dinas Powys.

=== Religious sites ===
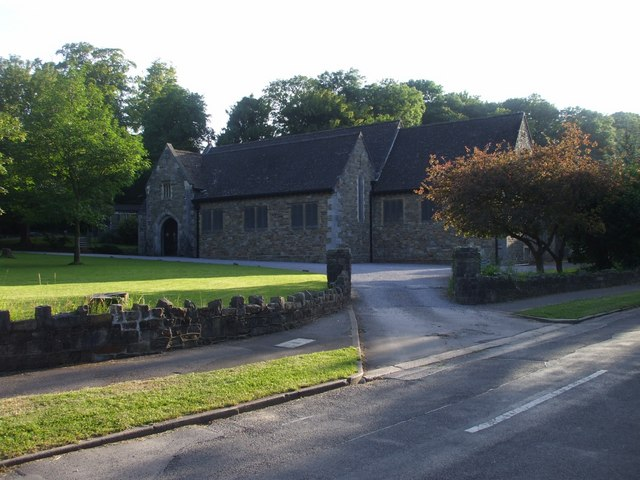
St Peter's Church

St. Peter's Church on Mill Road is the village's main Church in Wales parish church, while the Catholic congregation worships at St. Mary's on Edith Road. St Peter's was built in 1929–1930 to replace the old "Iron Church" in the village square, which had served as a chapel of ease for St. Andrew's since 1881, but could only hold 180 worshippers. The new church's foundation stone was laid on St. Peter's Day on 29 June 1929; it was consecrated on 15 October 1930. The church was designed by the Glamorgan architect John Coates Carter, and was built after his death. The stained-glass window above the main altar was donated by Ralph Henry Green (of Garnhill House). Much of the masonry was reused from the recently demolished Cyfarthfa Ironworks. St Peter's is currently a Grade II listed building.

Dinas Powys is also noted for its 14th-century Norman parish church, dedicated to St Andrew. This is located in the hamlet of St Andrews Major, just under a mile away from the village centre. There is also the nearby church of St Michael and All Angels in Michaelston-le-Pit.

There are two Methodist chapels in the village: one is a small "tin tabernacle" in the Eastbrook area; the larger Methodist Church backs onto Station Road. Dinas Powys Baptist Church meets in the Parish Hall on Britway Road, and Bethesda Chapel is on Fairoaks. Ebenezer Presbyterian Church is located in the Highwalls Road area.

== Education ==
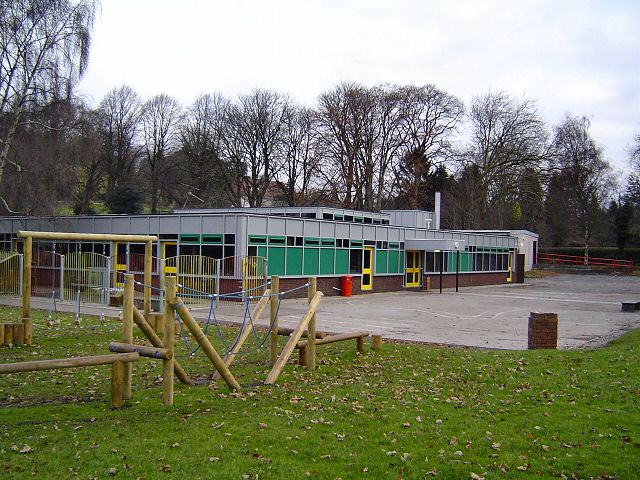
St Andrew's Major Primary School

The village has two primary schools: Dinas Powys Primary School (formed in 2015 by the amalgamation of Dinas Powys Infants' School and Murch Junior School) and St Andrews Major Church in Wales Primary School.

The village has no secondary school of its own. It was previously home to one half of Penarth’s St Cyres School. The site was the smaller of the school's two campuses and was for pupils aged 11 to 14; the site for the older children was in Penarth. However, the Dinas Powys site closed in 2012, and was replaced by a single, larger redeveloped site in Penarth.

== Transport ==
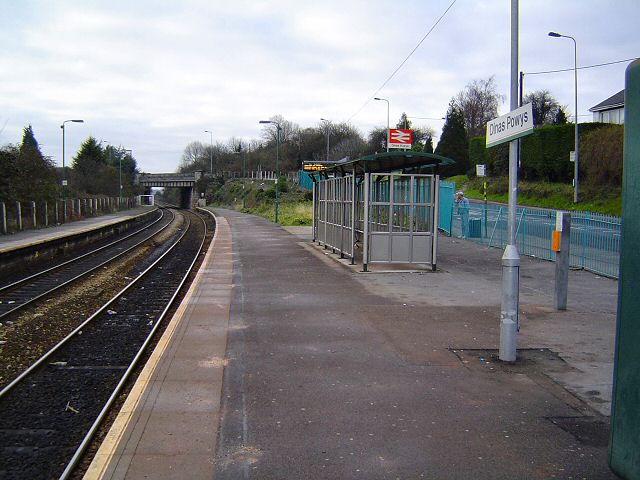
Dinas Powys station

Dinas Powys has two railway stations on the Barry branch between Cardiff Central and Barry Island, via Bridgend; these are Eastbrook and Dinas Powys. Transport for Wales operates regular services on this line to Barry Island, Bridgend, Cardiff Central, Bargoed and Rhymney.

Bus services are operated by Cardiff Bus and First Cymru; routes connect the village with Cardiff, Barry, Cadoxton and Llantwit Major.

The village is situated on the A4055 road, which connects Cardiff with Barry.

== Sport and recreation ==
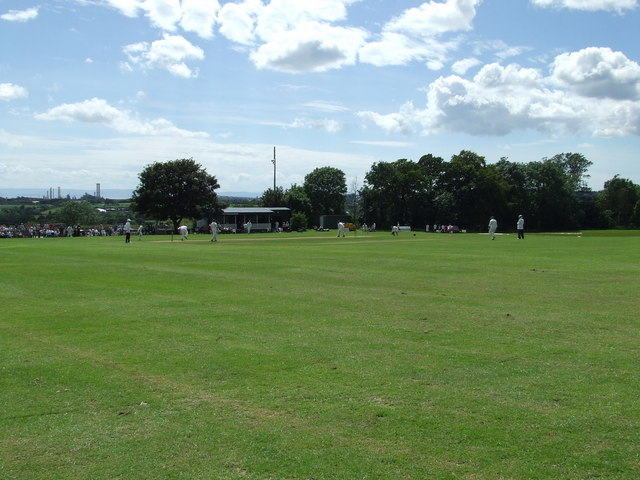
Cricket on the Common

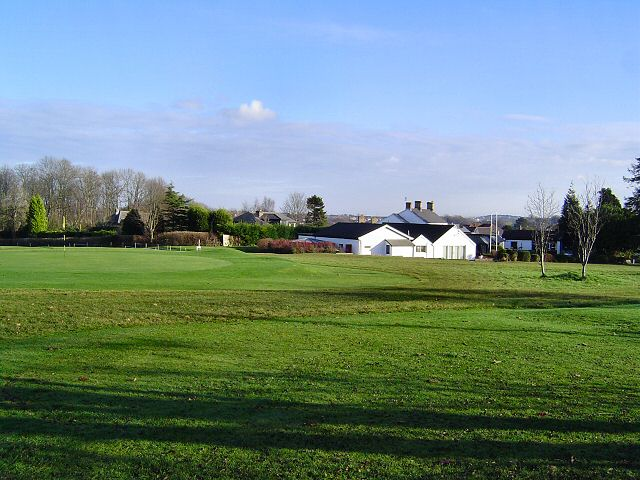
Dinas Powys Golf Club

Dinas Powys Cricket Club was established in 1882. The club fields three sides in the Welsh Club Cricket Conference, playing their home league matches at Parc Bryn y Don. There is also a Midweek League side, a Sunday friendly team and a junior section, playing their home matches on the village common.

The golf club was founded in 1914 and has views over the city of Cardiff and Cardiff Bay.

Dinas Powys F.C. was the first in the Vale of Glamorgan to achieve the Football Association of Wales' Club Accreditation Scheme bronze award.

There has been an active branch of the Pony Club in the village since 1975. There are also many voluntary organisations, including a large Scout group.

The recreation area at the village common, administered by Dinas Powys Community Council, is home to several sports teams. Rugby was played on the common in 1882, when a group of young farm workers challenged players at the new Gwalia Brickworks. Dinas Powys Rugby Club is located on the common and plays in the WRU League 1 East Central. The club has won the East District cup on two occasions and the 2nd XV (known as the Dingos) won the Mallett cup in 2016. Organised sports are also played on Parc Bryn-a-don and the Murch playing fields.

== In popular culture ==
In the BBC TV sitcom Gavin & Stacey, the house of Mick and Pam was filmed in Dinas Powys; viewers are led to believe it is in the Shipmans' home town of Billericay, in Essex.

The 2021 ITV television drama series Hollington Drive was filmed in Dinas Powys, in the luxury housing estate on Ardwyn Walk.

== Notable people ==
The following people live, or have previously lived, in Dinas Powys:

- John Smith (born 1951), former Labour MP
- Ray Smith (1936–1991), actor
- Huw Justin Smith (1965–2007), son of Ray Smith and better known as Pepsi Tate, bass guitarist of the glam metal band Tigertailz
- Dave Edmunds (born 1944), recording artist and record producer
- Donna Edwards (born 1963), actress
- Noel Johnson (1916–1999), radio actor
- Jeremy Colman (born 1948), former auditor general for Wales
- Charlotte Church (born 1986), singer and TV personality
- Darcey Harry (born 2003), professional golfer.
- Gaetano de Gennaro (1890–1959), Italian painter and portrait artist
- Sir Joseph Davies (1866–1954), businessman, statistician and Liberal politician
- Stan Jones (1930–2012), watercolour artist
- Peter Whittingham (1984–2020), Cardiff City footballer
- John Humphrey England (1817–1887), Victorian merchant
- John Rowlands (Giraldus) (1824–1891), antiquary, writer and educator
- Ian Eidman (born 1956), Wales rugby union international
- Audrey Williams (1902–1978), archaeologist and Fellow of the Society of Antiquaries
- David Ryder Prangley, musician
- John Noel Laughton Isaac (1911–1939), solicitor and RAF Volunteer Reserve officer, notable as the first British serviceman to die during the Second World War
