= Westminster City School =

Location
- 55 Palace Street; Westminster, London, SW1E 5HJ; England; 51°29′52″N 0°08′21″W

Information
- Type: Academy
- Motto: Strength in Unity
- Established: 17th century Refounded in 1877
- Department for Education URN: 138312 Tables
- Ofsted: Reports
- Head teacher: Peter Broughton
- Chaplain: Stephen Taylor
- Gender: Boys, mixed sixth form
- Age: 11 to 18
- Enrolment: 807
- Website: http://www.wcsch.com

Westminster City School is a state-funded secondary academy for boys, with a mixed sixth form, in Westminster. The school educates over 800 students. The current headteacher is Peter Broughton, while the current deputy headteachers are Jen Lockyer and Simon Brown.

The school became an academy in 2012. In March 2022, Ofsted rated it "good".

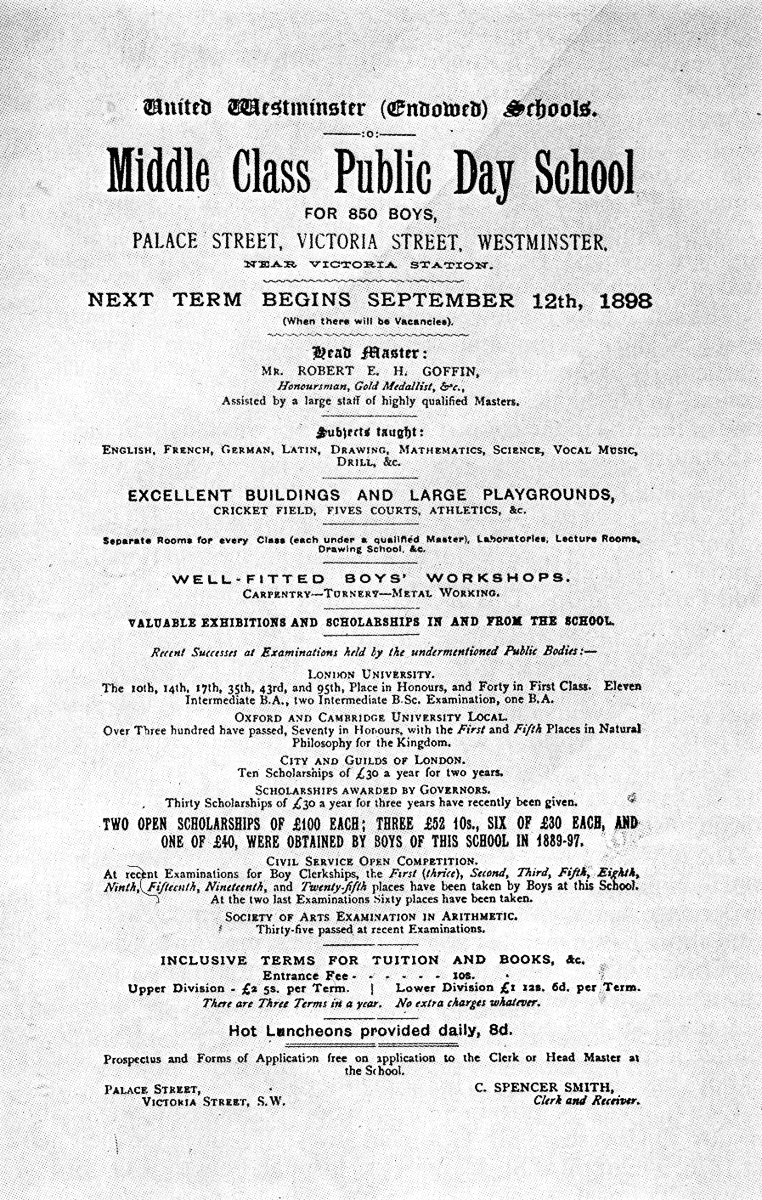
Old school poster

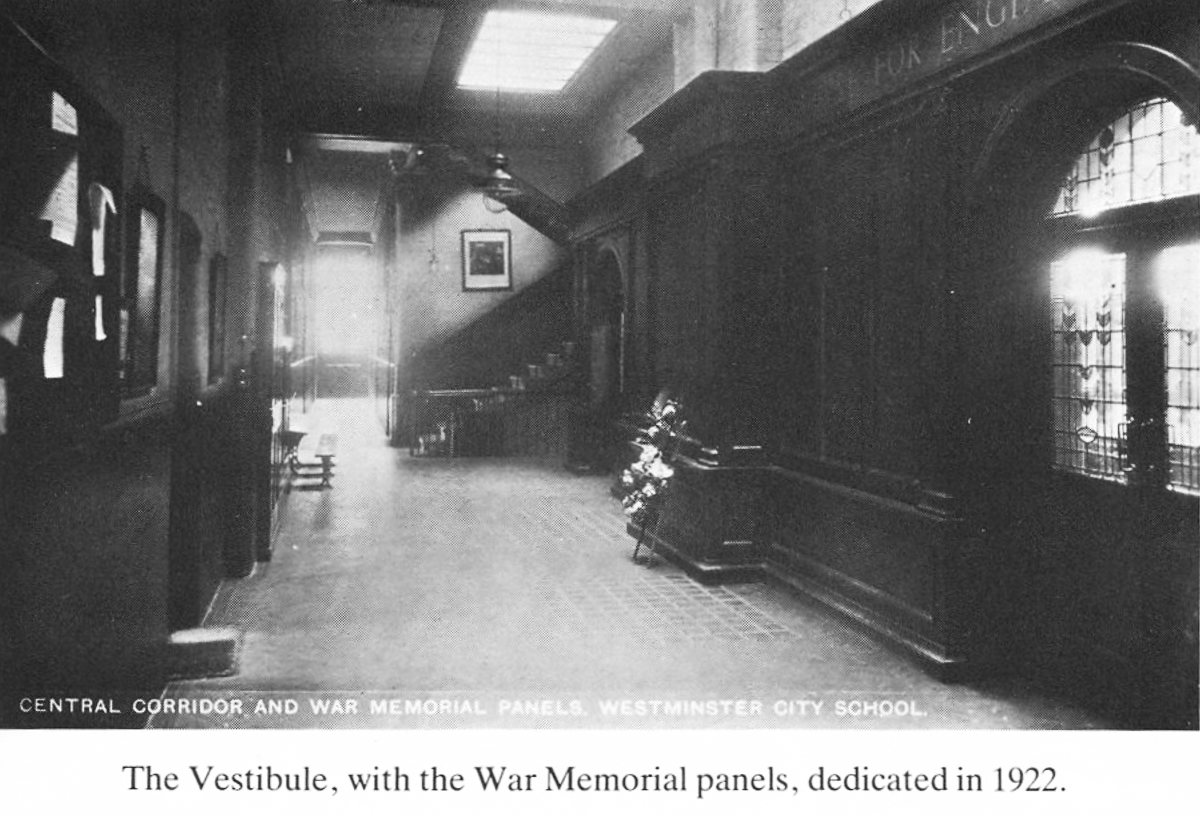
The vestibule 1922

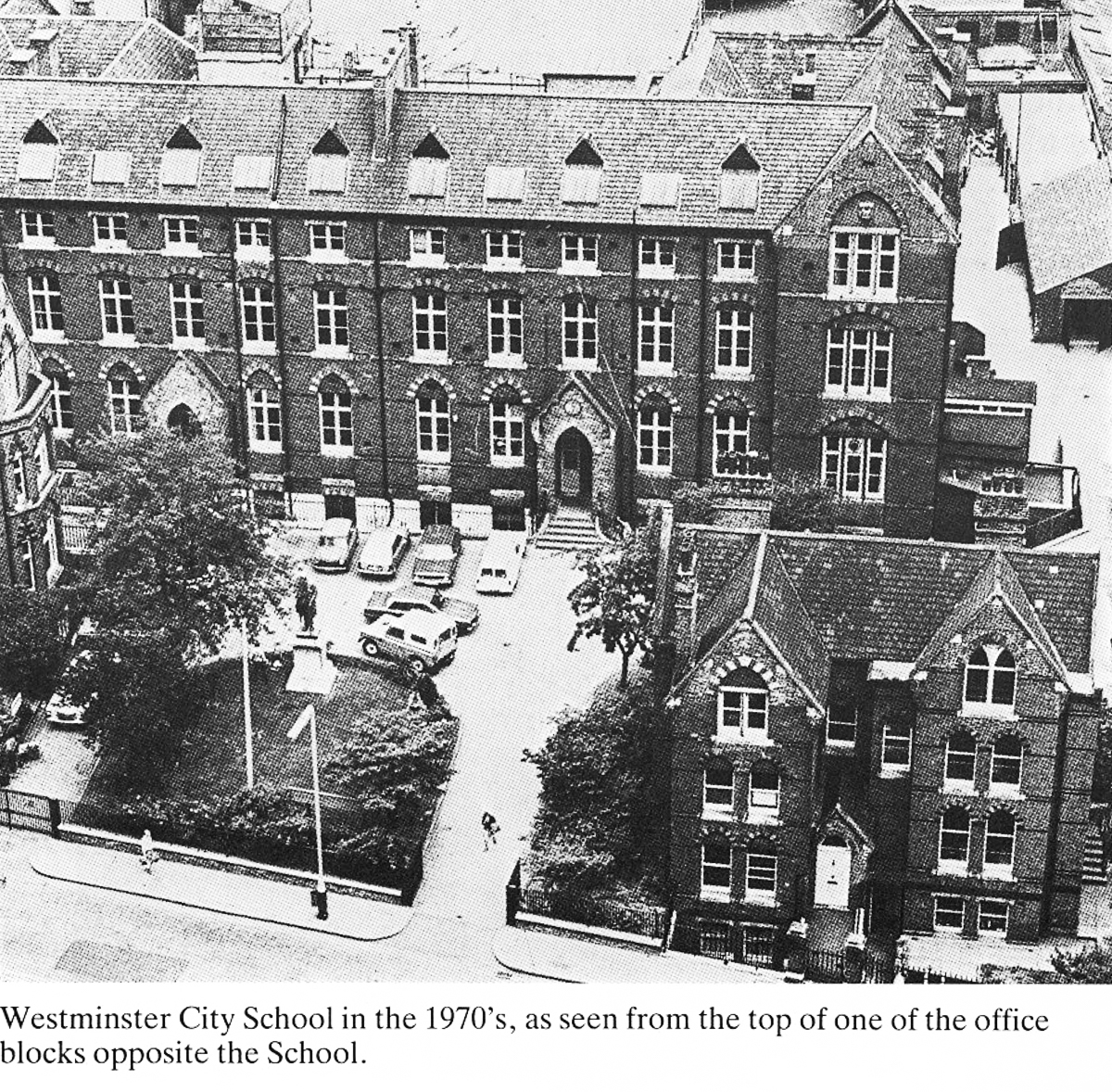
Aerial view of School

== History ==
The charters and foundations of several historic charity schools were by Act of Parliament in 1873 incorporated into the Grey Coat Hospital Foundation and United Westminster Schools (UWS) Foundation. UWS comprised the Westminster City School and Emanuel School, Wandsworth; the Grey Coat Hospital Foundation comprised the Grey Coat Hospital, Westminster and Queen Anne's School, Caversham. In 1910, the Worshipful Company of Clothworkers transferred the Sutton Valence School in Kent into UWS. Westminster City School is amalgamation of the former Brown Coat, Green Coat and Black Coat schools. Key dates in its history are:

- 1590: Lady Dacre petitions Queen Elizabeth I for a royal charter for a hospital in "this City of Westminster" and to provide "instruction of certain boys and girls".
- 1601: Queen Elizabeth grants order of incorporation for Emmanuel Hospital.
- 1624: Green Coat School Westminster opened.
- 1633: Charter of King Charles I for St Margaret's Hospital.
- 1654: A hospital, along with almshouses and a school, is founded by James Palmer in Westminster.
- 1671: Following a period of closure, Palmer's School is reopened as the Black Coat School.
- 1677: Bequest of benefactor Emery Hill to the Brown Coat School.
- 1688: Blue Coat School founded.
- 1698: Grey Coat Hospital founded.
- 1706: Queen Anne granted a royal charter to Grey Coat Hospital.
- 1736: Brown Coat School formally opened.
- 1847: Brown Coat school numbers increased to 60.
- 1873: Following a vote in Parliament, Queen Victoria approved amalgamation under United Westminster Schools.
- 1874: The school was formally opened.
- 1876: The 'foundation stone' was laid in Palace Street by Sir Sydney Waterlow.
- 1877: The new School building was opened by the Dean of Westminster, Arthur Penrhyn Stanley.
- 1878–9: The Science and Art Department withdrew accreditation from headmaster Goffin on suspicion of supplying exam answers to students, a claim supported by a Parliamentary select committee. The school's governors retained Goffin in office, claiming he was only guilty of "over cramming".
- 1890: School officially named Westminster City School.
- 1901: The sculptor Frank Taubman placed a copy of the statue of Waterlow in front of the school.
- 1918: Education Act gives Westminster City grammar school status.
- 1939: Outbreak of the Second World War with school evacuated to Tonbridge, Kent area, amalgamating with the Judd School.
- 1940s: Westminster City School Palace Street building was badly damaged in an air raid during the Blitz.
- 1944: School moved from Tonbridge to Exmouth.
- 1945: With the end of the Second World War, school re-assembles in Westminster with numbers now down to 350.
- 1958: Golden jubilee year of the Old Westminster Citizens' Association. The school was used as a location for the film Inn of the Sixth Happiness starring Ingrid Bergman.
- 1963: 330th anniversary of the Charles I charter celebrated with a service at St. Margaret's Church, attended by Queen Elizabeth the Queen Mother who visited the school after the service.
- 1977: Westminster City School celebrates 100 years at Palace Street and becomes a four form entry mixed ability comprehensive school.
- 1983: Westminster City School and its Origins, by R. Carrington, is published.
- 2004: A teacher was raped by a pupil after class. The pupil involved was sent to prison and the teacher eventually won compensatory damages and legal costs from the school.
- 2018: £6 million Jack Pouchot Building officially opened by Prince Edward, Duke of Kent. It improves music, art and drama spaces for pupils and is named after Jack Pouchot, a former pupil and the youngest man to be decorated with the Distinguished Conduct Medal in battle during the First World War.

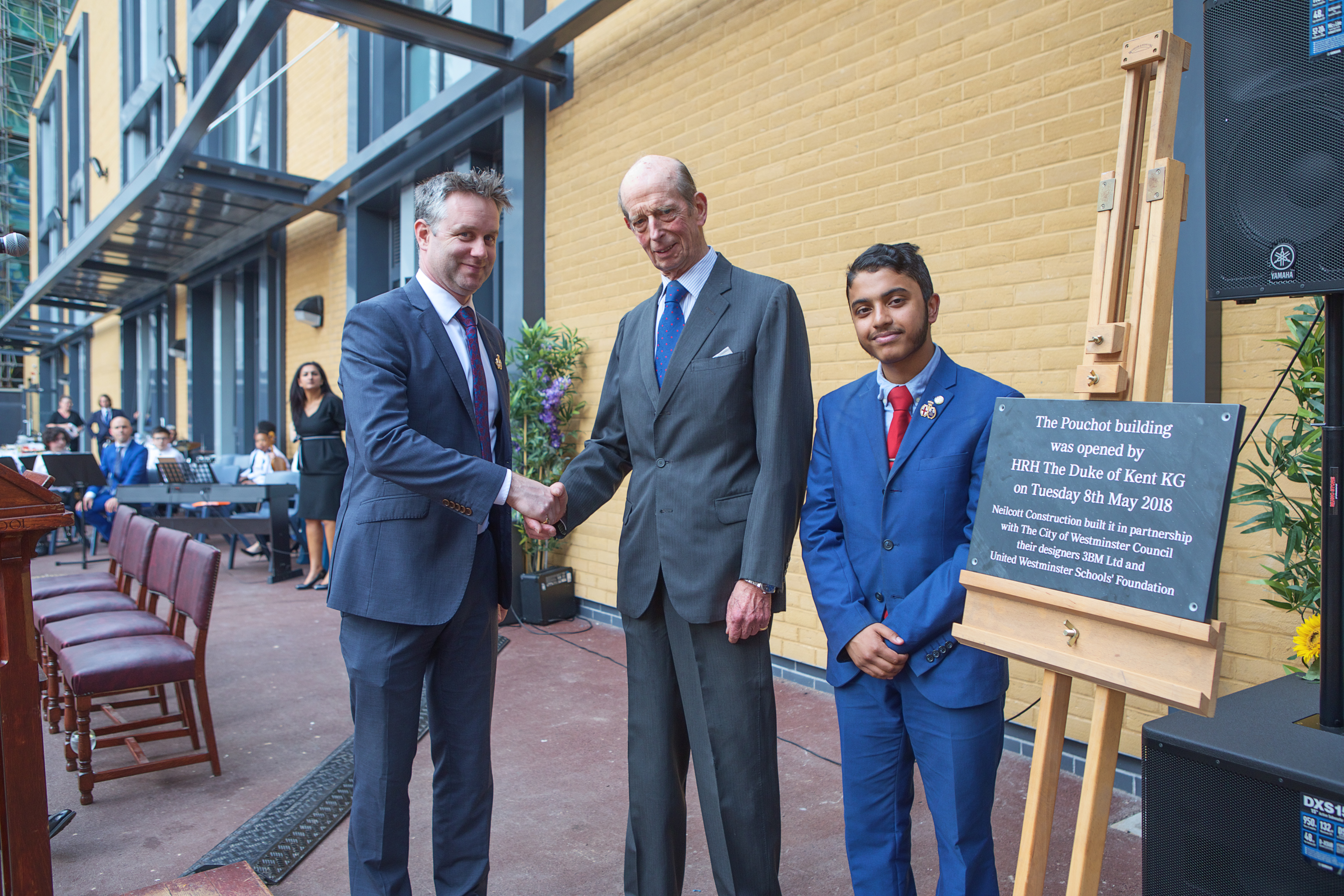
The Duke of Kent at the opening of the Pouchot Building

== Notable former students ==
=== Recent living alumni ===
- John Boyega (born 17 March 1992) is a British-Nigerian actor, known for the lead role in 2011 film Attack the Block and his main role in the Star Wars sequel trilogy.
- Wes Streeting (born 21 January 1983) is the Labour Member of Parliament for Ilford North and former Secretary of State for Health and Social Care.
- Andy Hamilton (born 28 May 1954) is a British comedian, game show panellist, television director, comedy screenwriter, and radio dramatist.
- Terry Marsh (born 7 February 1958) is a former professional boxer who was an undefeated world champion.

=== Other notable pupils (from Westminster City Grammar School days) ===
- John Walter Baxter (4 June 1917 – 21 October 2003) was a British civil engineer.
- Brebis Bleaney (6 June 1915 – 4 November 2006) was a British physicist, known for contributions to electron paramagnetic resonance (EPR).
- Martin Broughton (born 1947) is a British businessman.
- James Dale Cassels (22 March 1877 – 7 February 1972) was a British judge, journalist and Conservative politician.
- Stuart Davies (5 December 1906 – 22 January 1995) was an aeronautical engineer, president from 1971 to 1972 of the Royal Aeronautical Society (RAeS), and assistant chief designer for Avro during World War Two, contributing to the Lancaster, and Avro York, becoming chief designer from 1945 to 1955.
- Peter Galloway (born 1954) is an Anglican priest and historian.
- Sir Cyril Hinshelwood (19 June 1897 – 9 October 1967) was an English physical chemist and winner of the Nobel Prize in 1956.
- Anatole Kaletsky (born 1952) has been an economics journalist for The Economist magazine and the Financial Times and The Times newspapers.
- Percy Edgar Lambert, (1881 – 31 October 1913) was the first person to drive an automobile a hundred miles in an hour.
- John Auguste Pouchot (known as Jack) was the youngest man to be decorated with the Distinguished Conduct Medal in battle during the First World War.
- Walter Layton, 1st Baron Layton (15 March 1884 – 14 February 1966), was a British economist, editor and newspaper proprietor.
- Brian Lightman (15 June 1955), was general secretary from 2010 to 2016 of the Association of School and College Leaders (ASCL).
- Roger Livesey (1906–1976), British film actor, perhaps best known for the feature film A Matter of Life and Death.
- Andy Mackay (born 23 July 1946) musician, best known as a founding member of the art-rock group Roxy Music.
- Edgar Mountain (2 April 1901 – 30 April 1985) competed in over 800m distance at the Olympic Games in both 1920 and 1924.
- Tim Parks, author and translator, who has been resident in Italy for more than 40 years.
- Alan Francis Bright Rogers (1907–2003) was an Anglican Bishop who held three different posts in an ecclesiastical career spanning over half a century.
- Denis Rooke (2 April 1924 – 2 September 2008) was a British industrialist and engineer.
- Norman Rosenthal (born 1944) is an independent curator and art historian.
- Arnold Spencer-Smith (17 March 1883 – 9 March 1916) was a British clergyman and amateur photographer who joined Sir Ernest Shackleton's Imperial Trans-Antarctic Expedition, 1914–17.
- John Edward Tomlinson, Baron Tomlinson (born 1 August 1939) is a British Labour Co-operative politician. He is currently a life peer in the House of Lords.
- Christopher Warren-Green (born 30 July 1955, Gloucestershire) is a British violinist and conductor.
- Robin Le Mesurier (1953–2021) was a British guitarist. He was the son of comedy actors John Le Mesurier and Hattie Jacques.
