= Ashvin Gatha =

Indian-born international photojournalist, advertising and editorial photographer

- Born: 5 December 1941; Gujarat
- Died: 17 March 2015 (aged 73); Switzerland
- Occupation: Photographer

Ashvin Gatha was an Indian photojournalist, advertising and editorial photographer.

== Early life ==
Ashvin Gatha was born on 5 December 1941 in Gujarat, and spent his early childhood in an orphanage from which, at age 14, he was adopted by his uncle, a nuclear scientist. Ashvin moved with him to Singapore at age 22. There, he won a newspaper contest with a picture of the cat and some ducks in his uncle's garden made with a Box Brownie which he borrowed from a cousin, and with the reward he was able to buy a used 120 camera, then later graduated to a Mamiya "professional" camera. He determined to become a photographer, despite the objections of his family.

== Career ==
Ashvin returned to Mumbai. From a meagre income of 5 rupees a day, he saved 40 percent to buy a single roll of colour film a month. He assembled a portfolio and began to get small assignments. He was hired as chief photographer at Eve's Weekly and, through her brother, recruited Shobha De to produce several features with him, including a cover for the magazine.

Air India hired him and paid his way to the U.S. and on the plane he met the art director Tony Paladino, from whom Gatha picked up further work. He lived in New York for two years, working advertising agencies and fashion houses and covered the 1963 March on Washington for Jobs and Freedom and the 1969 Woodstock Music Festival. He also worked for the United Nations, and for C.A.R.E. he was sent to produce a feature story on their school feeding program in South India.

As he became known in photography circles in New York, the Kodak Company invited Gatha to spend time with them in Rochester, training in colour photography. His work soon appeared in their magazines and publicity material. In 1970 had a folio of his work published in Popular Photography, then in Le Nouveau Photocinema in January 1973. At this time, he met Flora, a dancer from London. They married in 1971, had a daughter Ianthe and lived in London. Together they created multimedia shows combining dance, mime and photography; for their film "Devdasi" the setting was the Sun Temple in Konarak, Orissa. Flora's career as a dancer and Ashvin's as a photographer took them apart, and they eventually separated, she taking Flora Devi as her stage name. Ashvin died on 17 March 2015 in Switzerland

== Exhibitions ==
From the 1980s, Gatha's exhibitions have been organised thematically by colour and have been exhibited in Europe, Asia, Australia, the United States. In early 1982 he was included in a group show Festival of India: Photography in India 1858-1980 at The Photographers' Gallery and the Barbican Art Centre. Then, in September/October 1982, he showed an exhibition and audio-visual—picture and sound backgrounds for Flora's dances—at Galerie le Vieux Jacob in Sion, near Geneva.

From the 1990s he Gatha based himself in Switzerland, returning to India on occasion, where in 1995 he presented a workshop at the Mohile Parikh Center, Mumbai.

== Reception ==
Mukesh Parpiani, curator of the Piramal Art Gallery in assembling a 2009 exhibition that includes Gatha, has called him one of the godfathers of Indian photography amongst Praful Patel, A L Sayed, R R Bhardwaj, Jyoti Bhatt, T Kashin, Tarpada Banerjee, Pranlal Patel, and John Isaac.
