= Ian Eidman =

- Full name: Ian Harold Eidman
- Born: 31 October 1956 (age 70) Cardiff, Wales

Rugby union career
- Position: Prop
International career
Years	Team	Apps	(Points)
1983–86	Wales	13	(0)

Ian Harold Eidman (born 31 October 1956) is a Welsh former rugby union international.

Eidman grew up in Dinas Powys and attended Penarth Grammar School.

A prop, Eidman played most of his rugby for Cardiff RFC, appearing in over 200 games. He scored the only try in the drawn 1982 Welsh Cup final against Bridgend, which won Cardiff the title on countback.

Eidman made his debut for Wales in 1983, coming into the team in place of long standing prop Graham Price for a Five Nations match against Scotland. He remained with Wales until 1986 and earned a total of 13 caps. In 1987, he was a stand-by for the World Cup and when Stuart Evans got injured was controversially overlooked in favour of Dai Young, an uncapped prop who happened to be playing club rugby at the time in Australia, one of the host countries.

Since leaving rugby, Eidman has worked in the printing industry.

== See also ==
- List of Wales national rugby union players
