= St Cyres School =

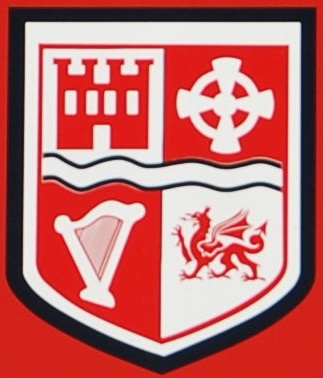

Location
- Sully Road; Penarth, Vale of Glamorgan, CF64 2XP; Wales
- Coordinates: 51.438°N 3.195°W

Information
- Type: Community school
- Motto: Strive Together. Challenge Yourself. Realise Everyone can Succeed.
- Established: 1958
- Local authority: Vale of Glamorgan Council
- Department for Education URN: 401805 Tables
- Head teacher: P Lewis
- Teaching staff: 75.4 (on an FTE basis)
- Gender: Mixed
- Age range: 11–18
- Enrolment: 1,143 (2018)
- Student to teacher ratio: 15.2
- Language: English
- Colours: Black, Grey, Red
- Alumni: Old St Cyrians
- Website: www.stcyres.org

St Cyres School is an 11–18 mixed, English-medium, community secondary school and sixth form in Penarth, Vale of Glamorgan, Wales. It was established in 1958.

Until June 2012, the school was split over two sites: the larger site at Penarth, and a smaller lower school (years 7 to 9) in the nearby village of Dinas Powys. The school has since been unified and moved into a new site, in the Penarth Learning Community.

== History ==
The school has had three names in its history: St Cyres Secondary Modern School, St Cyres Comprehensive School, and now, St Cyres School. The school was established in 1958 and celebrated its 50th anniversary year during the Autumn term of 2008. Several special events took place marking the anniversary.

Between 1958 and 1968 the school roll was bolstered by children from Radyr on the other side of Cardiff as it was quicker and easier for them to travel the nine miles by train to Penarth and attend either St Cyres Secondary Modern or Penarth Grammar School, than it was to walk or drive to nearer Cardiff schools. The arrangement only ceased when the direct rail link was removed by the Beeching axe.

=== Buildings ===
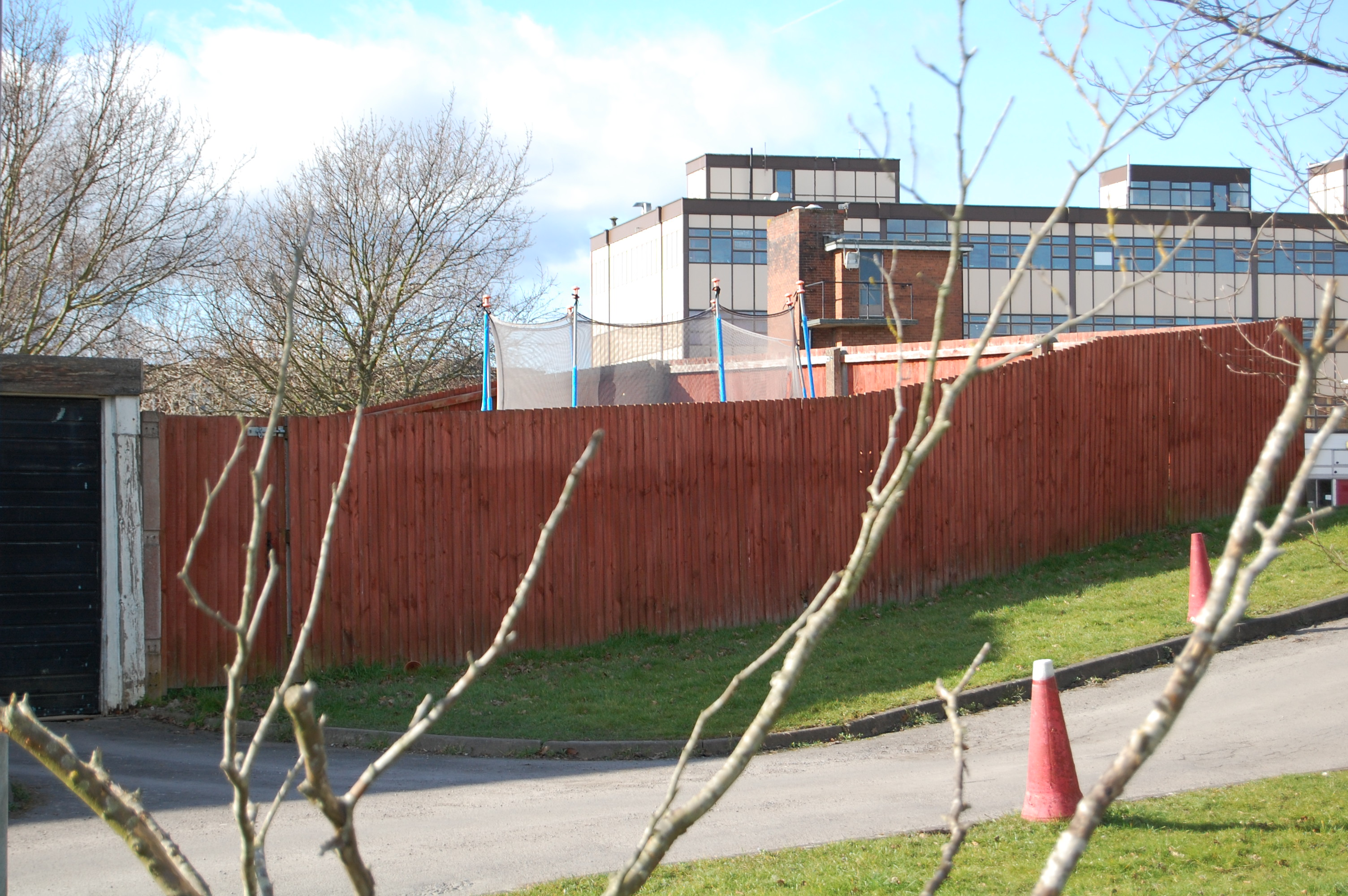
St Cyres New Block.

The Penarth Site was divided into five parts, each built at different times: the Old Block, the Annexe, the New Block, the Terrapins, and the Science Block. The Penarth Site's 'New Block' (which housed the sciences, mathematics, geography, and the Sixth Form) was considered to be the highest vantage point in Penarth.

Planning approval was granted in September 2012 to redevelop St Cyres and amalgamate it with two nearby special schools (Ysgol Er'w Delyn, Ashgrove) and Barry’s Ysgol Maes Dyfan. Work was expected to be completed by the end of 2014.

The proposals were to cost £48 million and would see the transformation of the St Cyres site into a brand new learning campus, incorporating St Cyres School on a single site. Completion would see the school reunited on the single Penarth site with the Dinas Powys lower school being closed.

=== Penarth Learning Community ===
The Penarth Learning community is a key element to the schools investment program with the funding scheme provided by the Welsh Government and Vale of Glamorgan Council under the Government's 21st century program.

The site is located on the western edge of Penarth and the new build spreads onto the old St Cyres playing fields. The two schools (St Cyres School, and the SEN school) are accommodated within one building. St Cyres holds a larger section of the building, with 11,851 sqm, and the SEN school a gross internal area of 7,942 sqm.

=== Fairtrade school ===
In 2008, St Cyres was granted "Fairtrade status" by Fair Trade Wales and became the first secondary school in Penarth to be so recognised. It was also one of the first Fairtrade schools in the Principality. Penarth has been a "Fairtrade Town" since 2006. The school has a long-standing link with the Penarth Town Fairtrade Forum and its support was recognised when Penarth became the first Fairtrade Town in the area. The school has a teacher and pupil representatives as members. The pupils who run the Fairtrade scheme in the school were recognised in October 2009 by the award of the national Diana Award for Excellence.

=== Shares4Schools ===
St Cyres School was the only school in Wales that took part in the Shares4Schools investment competition, using real funds, amongst 84 schools in the rest of the UK.

The competition started in October 2007 and ran until June 2008, organised and partially sponsored by The Share Centre. Schools taking part had to initially raise £1,500 as their investment funds.

=== Cyres Sound ===
On 19 September 2011, St Cyres School launched its own 24-hour internet radio station, Cyres Sound. The idea was conceived by ex- Real Radio Wales Richard Hopkin, who is now a music teacher at the school. During school hours, pupils run their own live shows, pre-recorded shows are broadcast in the evening and weekends, including educational programmes produced by teachers. The genre of music is Pop/Rock although specialist shows are also broadcast.

=== SCTV - St Cyres Television ===
On 23 March 2013, St Cyres School created a YouTube channel under the name of SCTV - St Cyres Television. The channel contains a wide variety of videos, typically uploading videos based around the current events happening in the school, such as sports day and awards evening videos. The channel also uploads the occasional humorous video, notably the St Cyres Teachers Baked Bean Challenge, which helped raise money for the Children In Need Foundation 2019. The channel is primarily managed by Richard Hopkin.

== Curriculum ==
=== Welsh Baccalaureate ===
St Cyres has been one of the leading pioneer centres for the introduction and development of the Welsh Baccalaureate Qualification and was one of the first schools to offer the course at Advanced Level (A Level) in Wales. St Cyres was also one of the first schools to offer the qualification at Intermediate level (GCSE).

== School badge ==
The school badge consists of a quartered shield depicting:

- A Castle Keep (relating to the Dinas Powys castle)
- A Celtic Cross (relating to the Welsh national symbol)
- A Welsh Harp (relating to Erw'r Delyn – the "Field of the Harp" – the original shape of the land)
- A Welsh Dragon (relating to the Welsh symbol)

== Notable alumni ==
- David Davies, swimmer
- Tanni Grey-Thompson, politician, television presenter and former wheelchair racer
- Jamie Ringer, rugby union player

== Notable staff ==
- Brian Lightman, former headmaster
- Audrey Evelyn Jones, former staff member and deputy headteacher
