= Stan Jones (painter) =

Welsh artist (1930–2012)

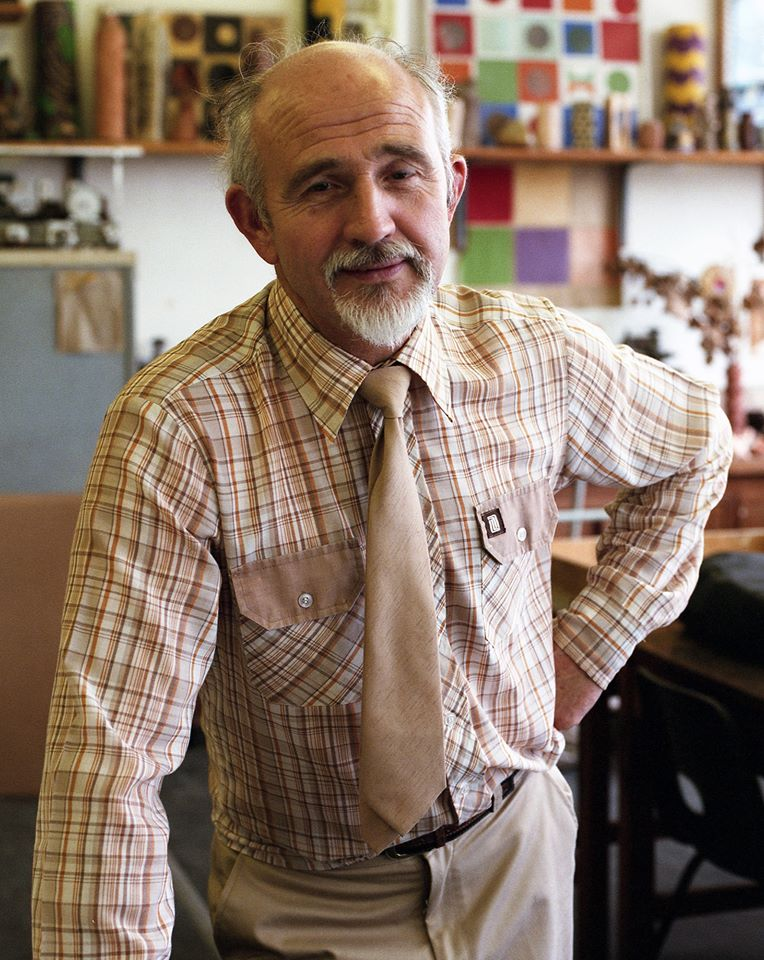

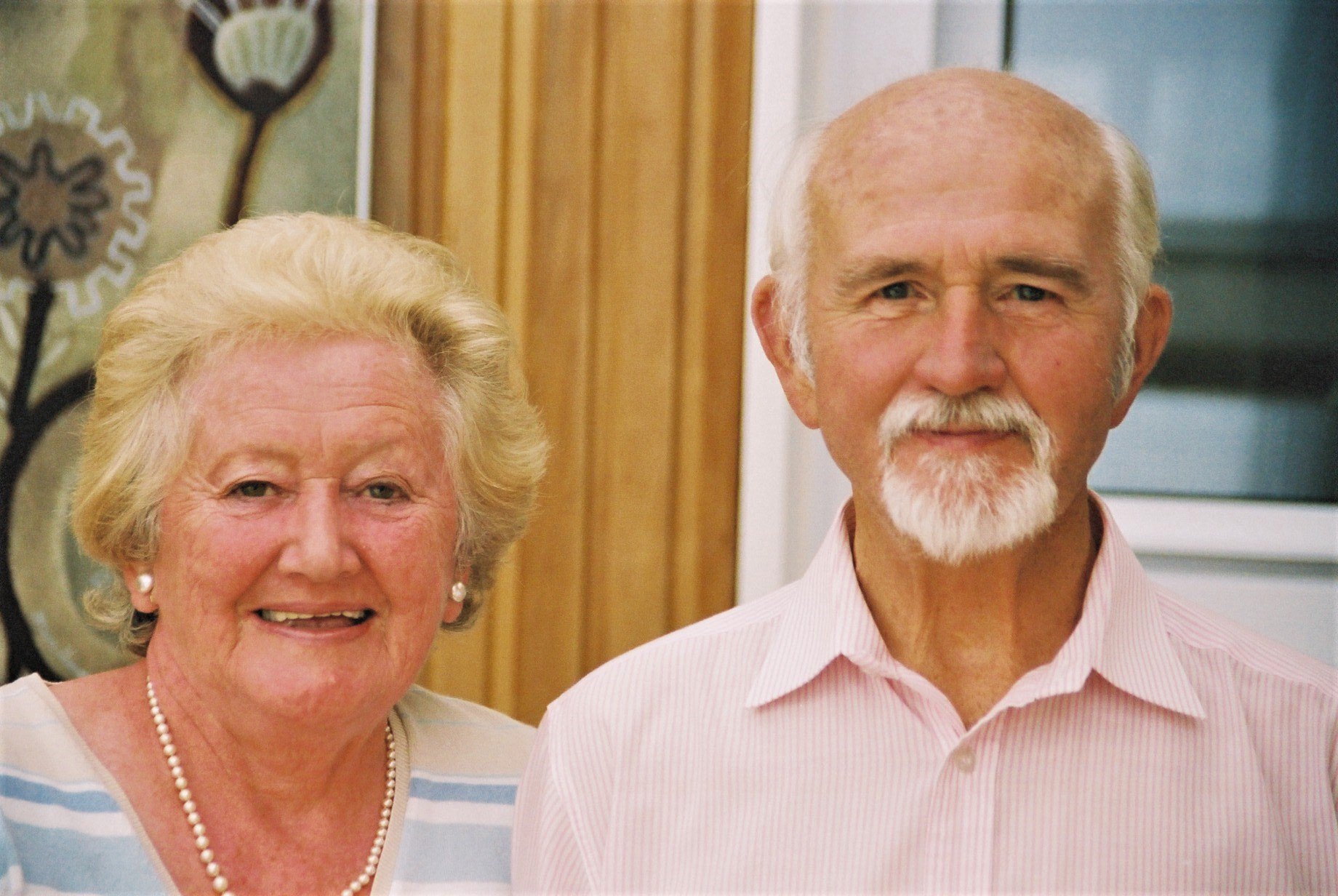
Stan Jones and wife at home, 2006

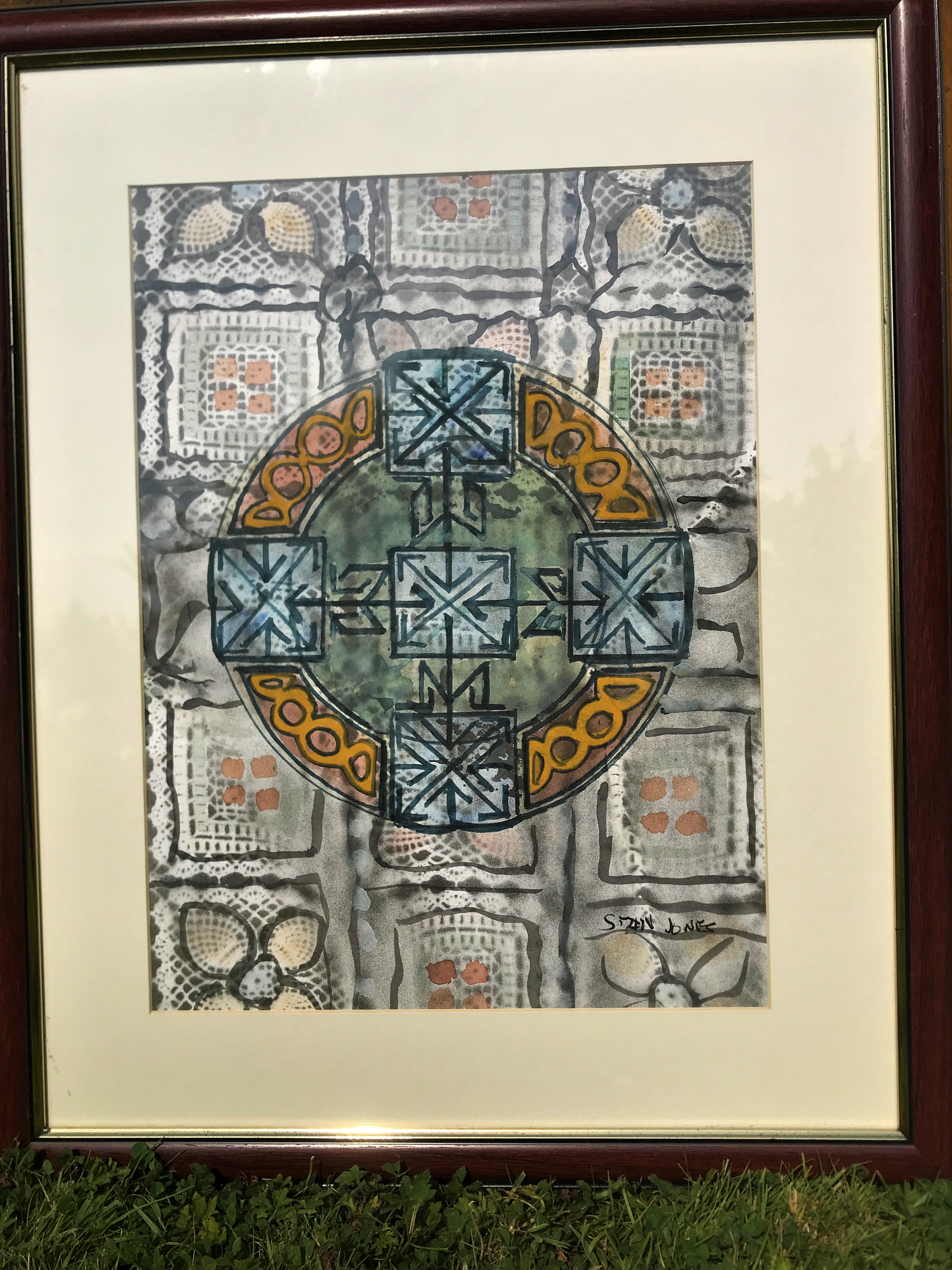
Celtic Symbol from Stan Jones in 1980s

Stanley Owen Jones (1930–2012) was a Welsh watercolour artist who was inspired by the natural world and in particular by references to nature in Dylan Thomas' poetry; he often painted images of plant life, and the sun.

== Early life and education ==
Jones grew up on a farm, called Werndew, in Pembrokeshire. As a youth he went to school in what's now known as 'yr Hen Ysgol' in Dinas Cross and then Fishguard Grammar, where he was head boy. On leaving Grammar School he did his National Service in the RAF.

After teacher training college in Swansea, Stan Jones studied art at Trinity University College in Carmarthen (1950–1952) and then Cardiff School of Art & Design from 1957 to 1958, where he was taught by Robert Hunter and Esther Grainger. During his teaching career he took different courses in Art and design, amongst them a years Design and Photography course (from 1971 to 1972) at Middlesex Polytechnic (now Middlesex University).

== Career ==
Jones early interest was in woodcuts and lino prints. Then he began painting with inspiration from Dylan Thomas' poetry and was inspired to paint over 100 watercolours using lines from the poetry such as ‘Happy as the grass was green’ and ‘Here were fond climates’. Jones was also inspired by the Sun and it is featured in many of his works of art. Many of his paintings also sought to capture forms of nature, particularly flowers and shrubs he saw around him.

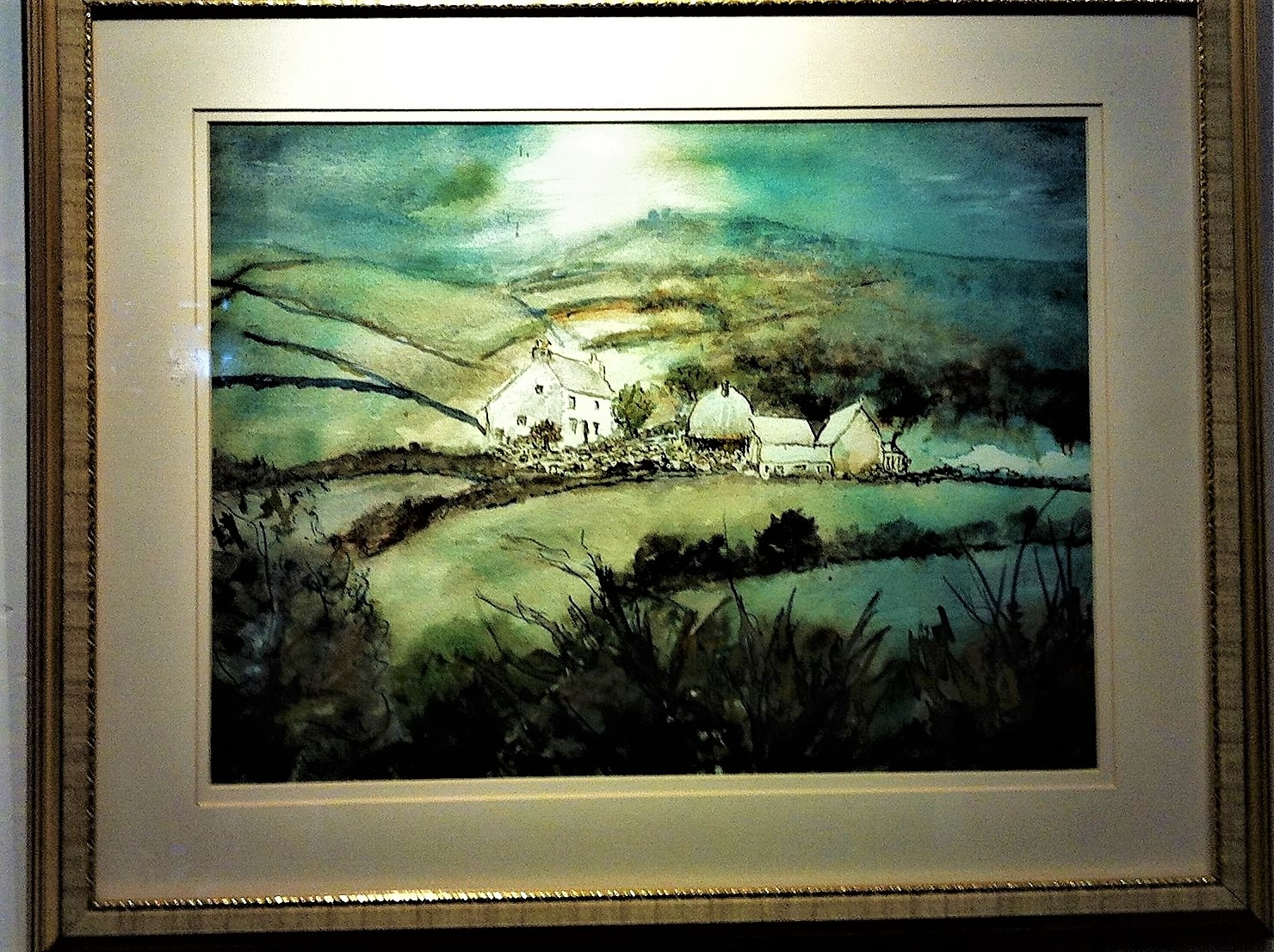
Werndew farm, artists birthplace, painted by Stan Jones

His first teaching job was at Victoria Primary School, Penarth from 1952 to 1957 and then he became head of the Art and Design Department at St Cyres School in Penarth. He taught at the school from 1959 to 1988.

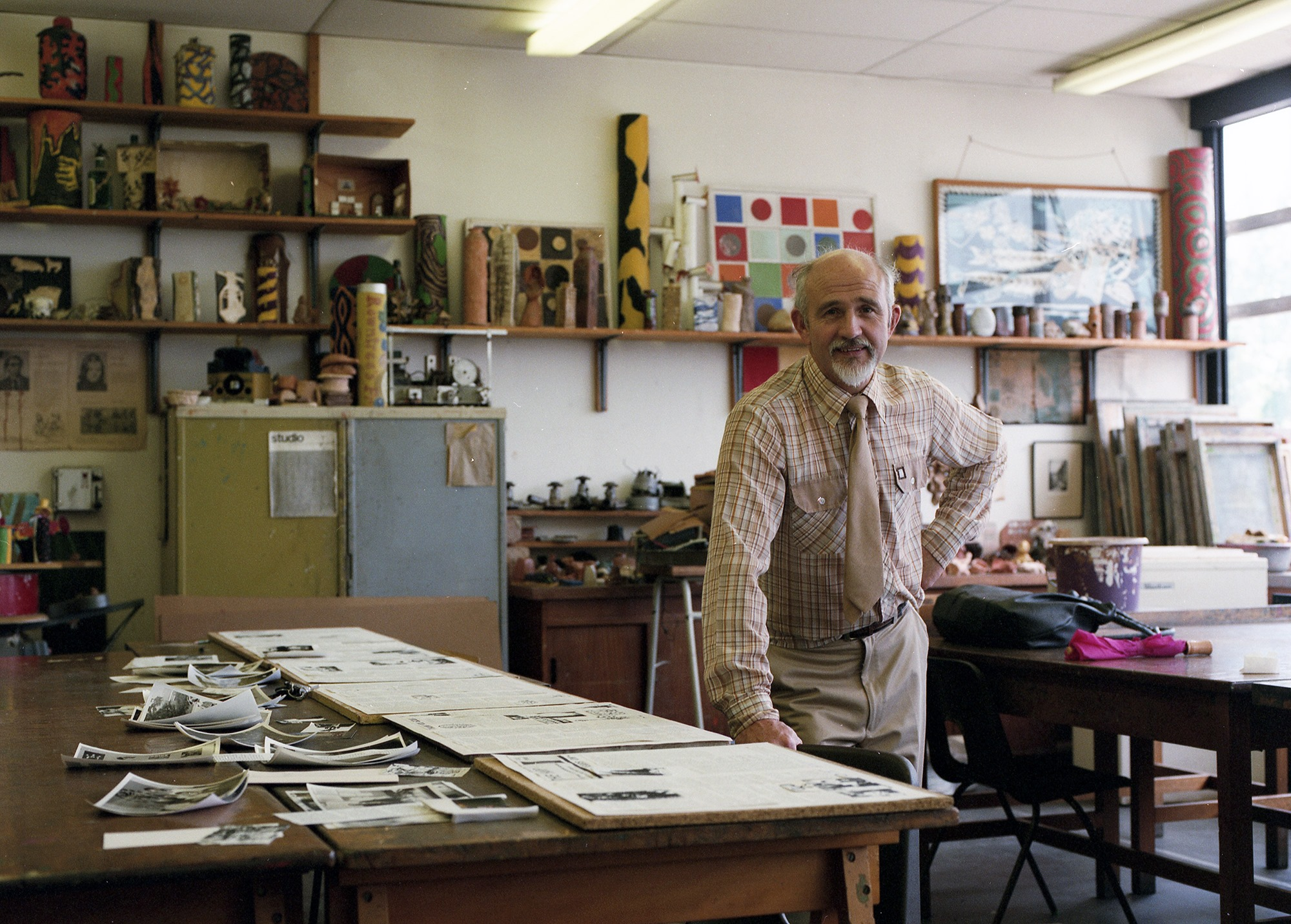
Jones in the Art Room at St Cyres School

After retiring as Head of the Art and Design Department in 1987, Jones became a part-time lecturer at South Glamorgan Institute of Higher Education from 1990 to 1998 and also tutored at the community centre in Penarth. He was Chairman of the Watercolour Society of Wales from 1973 to 1992 and had many exhibitions with that group. With this group he exhibited eleven times between 1957 and 1987 at the National Museum Wales.

Jones was also on the executive committee of the Contemporary Art Society for Wales (CASW) and designed their logo in 2000. He exhibited with them too and was responsible for choosing art students that would receive a grant from them. He also wrote a book in Welsh called Tra'd yn y Tir about growing up on Werndew Farm in Dinas Cross, Pembrokeshire and illustrated it throughout with pen and ink drawings.

Jones was married in 1958 and had one daughter in 1959. His wife Morfwyn Henry Jones, he described as his soulmate and she introduced him to the poetry of Dylan Thomas. From 1958 until his death Jones lived in Dinas Powys, South Wales.

Jones made several TV appearances including one on pottery for the BBC and various talking about his work as an artist. He also spoke on radio and was reviewed in papers such as the Western Mail

== Selected exhibitions ==
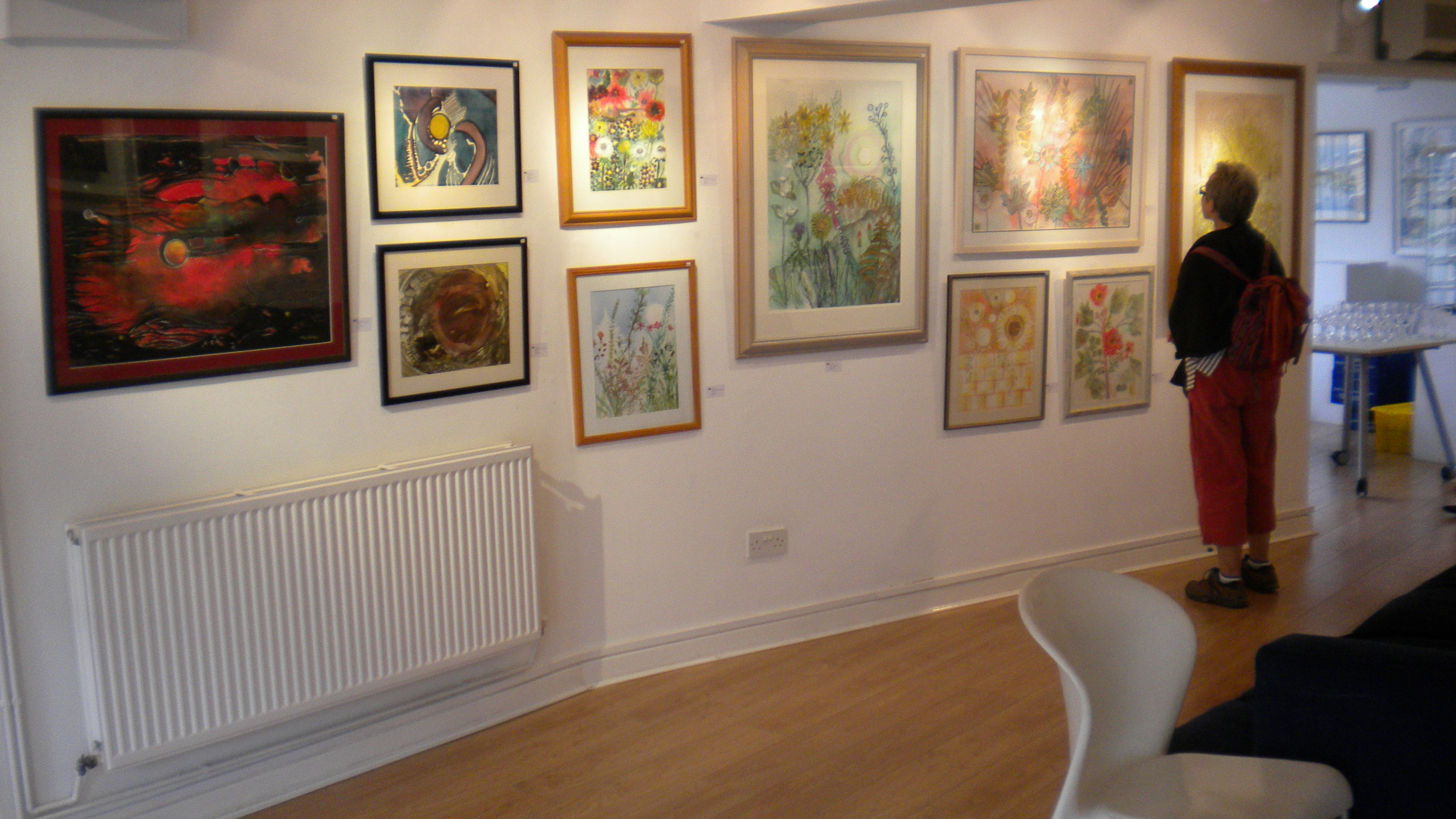
Retrospective exhibition (2010)

His work appeared at the Howard Roberts Gallery in Cardiff in 1968 under the title Four Glamorgan Artists and then the Albany Gallery, Cardiff in 1969 with the title Welsh Landscapes. He exhibited in a touring exhibition with the 'South Wales Group' between 1973 /74 which included the Glynn Vivian Art Gallery in Swansea and the City Art Gallery in Shrewsbury

Jones exhibited at the Royal National Eisteddfod of Wales seven times between 1963 and 1980.

Stan Jones was a prolific artist and exhibited over 50 times in his life, many of these one man shows. One man shows included an exhibition titled 'In the Beginning' and one called 'In my Intricate Image' (both poems by Dylan Thomas) in 1965 and 1966 at Thomson House, Cardiff; Haverfordwest Library 1972; Fishguard Library 1975; University College, Cardiff 1980; The Boat House, Laugharne, 1982; Sessions Gallery Newport West Wales 1985, 1994, 1998. He also had a one-man show in an exhibition called 'Welsh Artists Exhibiting in the United States of America' in Wenniger Gallery, Boston, USA in 1987, which was organised in conjunction with the Arts Council of Wales. Other exhibitions included : Turner House Gallery, Penarth, Fishguard Library (1975), Albany Gallery, Cardiff (1969), National Museum Wales (1957–1987, exhibited eleven times here).

For a month in September 1995 Stan Jones exhibited in a joint exhibition of The Watercolour Society of Wales and the Royal Cambrian Academy at Turner House Gallery, Penarth.

Along with other Welsh Artists, Stan Jones submitted a watercolour for an 'Art for Mercy' Auction and exhibition in November 2002 at the Washington Gallery, Penarth.

His last exhibition, "Stan Jones: A Retrospective", celebrating his 80th birthday, was at Oriel Washington Gallery in Penarth; ran from 4 – 25 July 2010.

A number of the artists sketches and paintings (76 in total) were acquired in 2014 by the National Library of Wales, Aberystwyth, known as the Bequest Collection. As well as the National Library of Wales, collections of his work include Cardiff University, the Arts Council of Wales, the local authorities of Cardiff, Glamorgan, Gwent, Walsall and Wiltshire. He has many works with private collectors including in Japan, America and Canada.

== Gallery ==
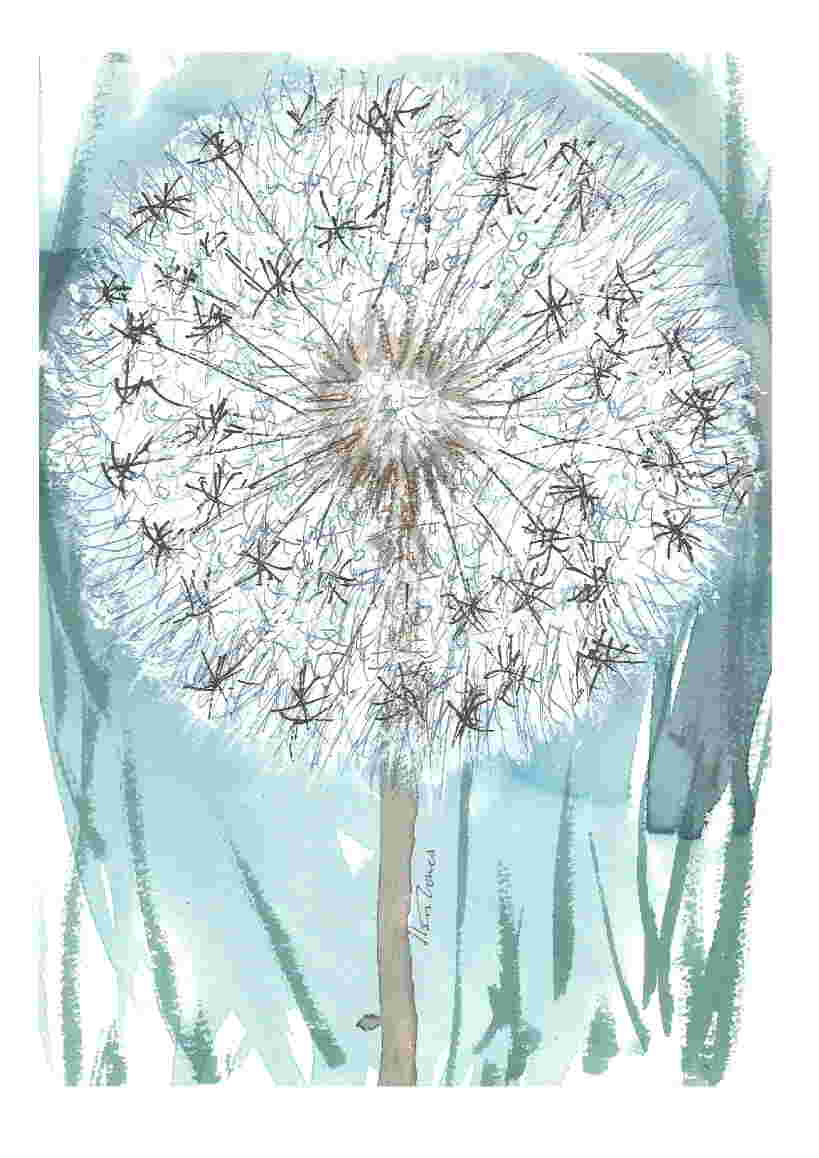

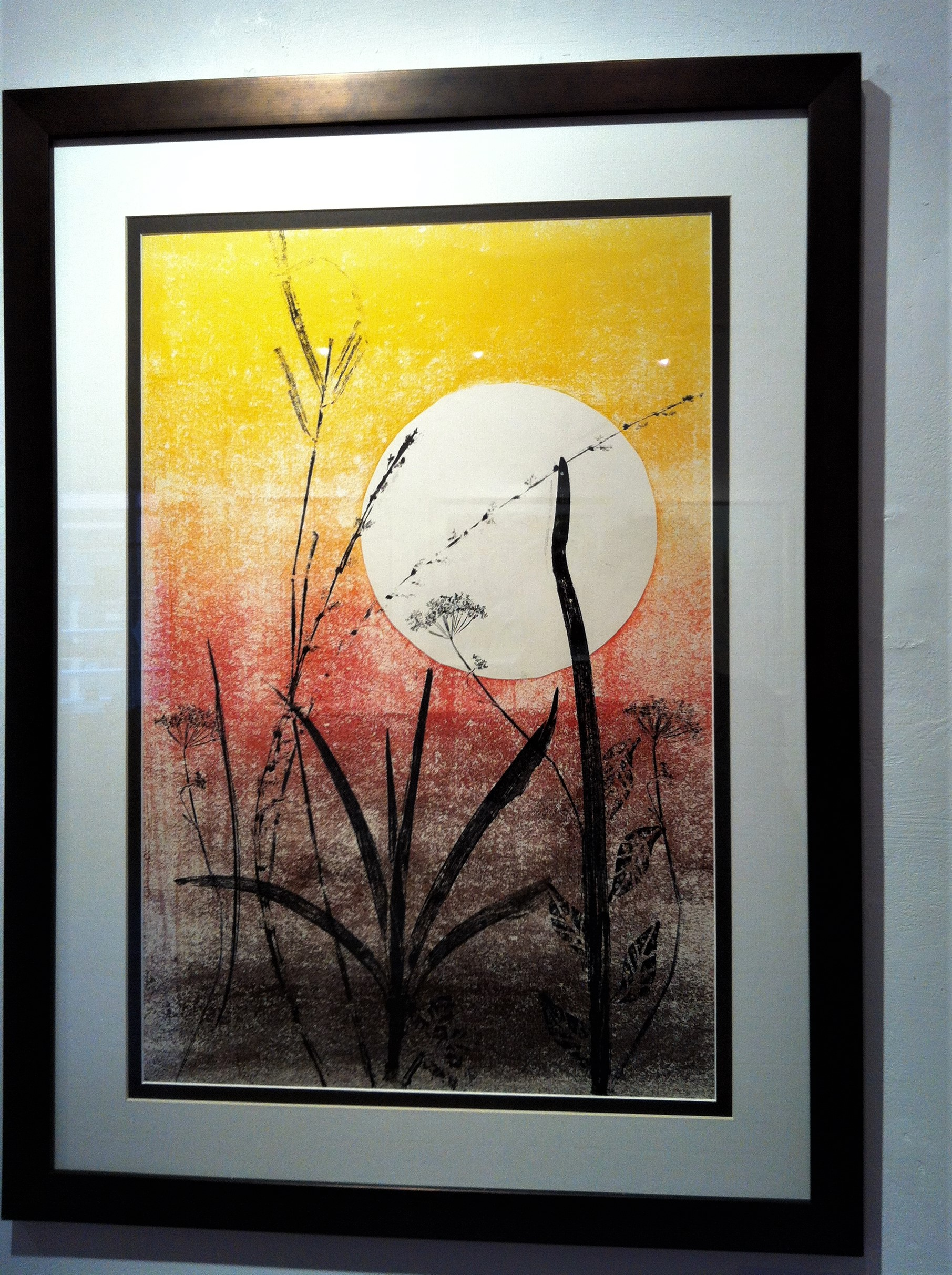

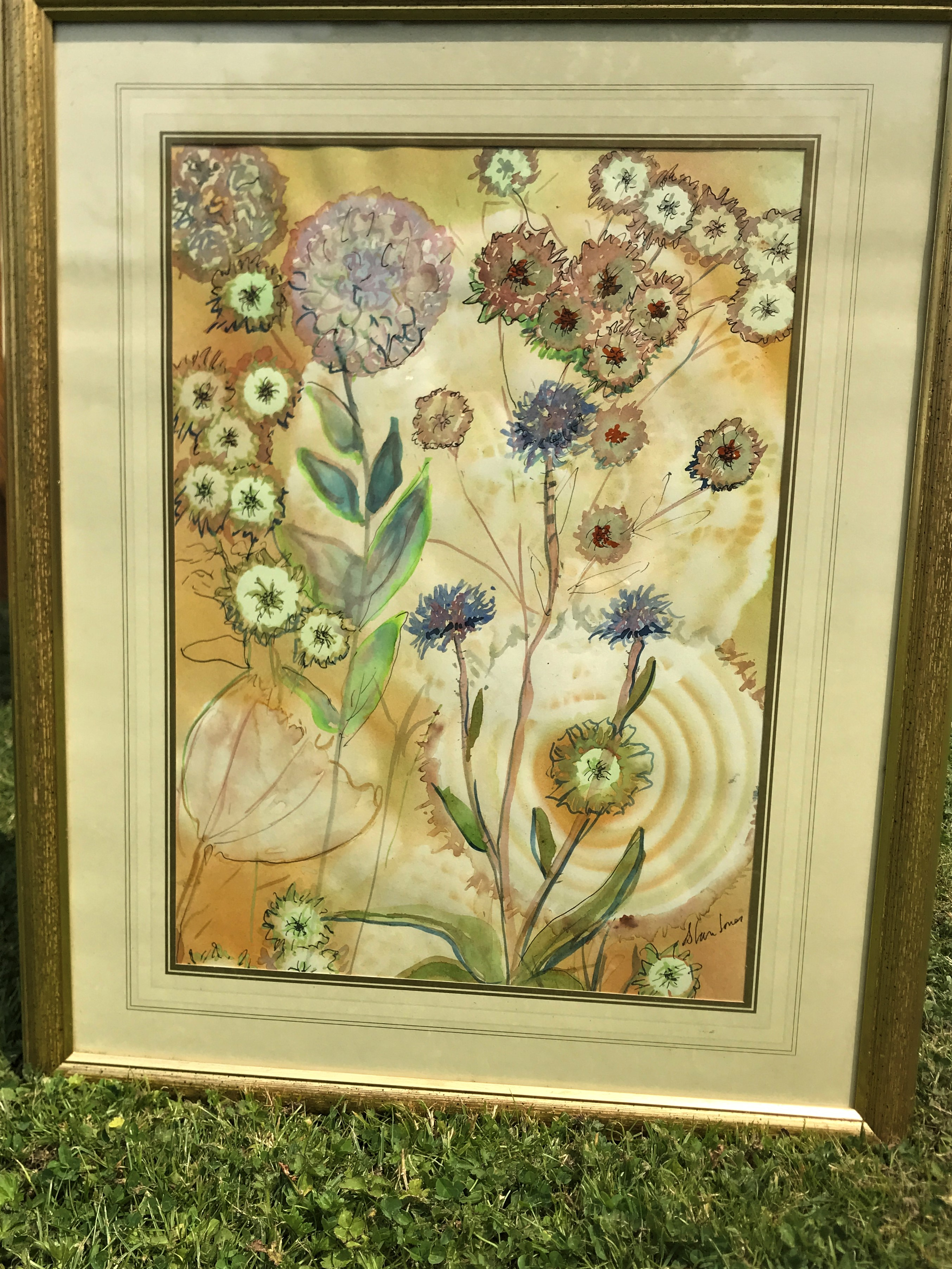

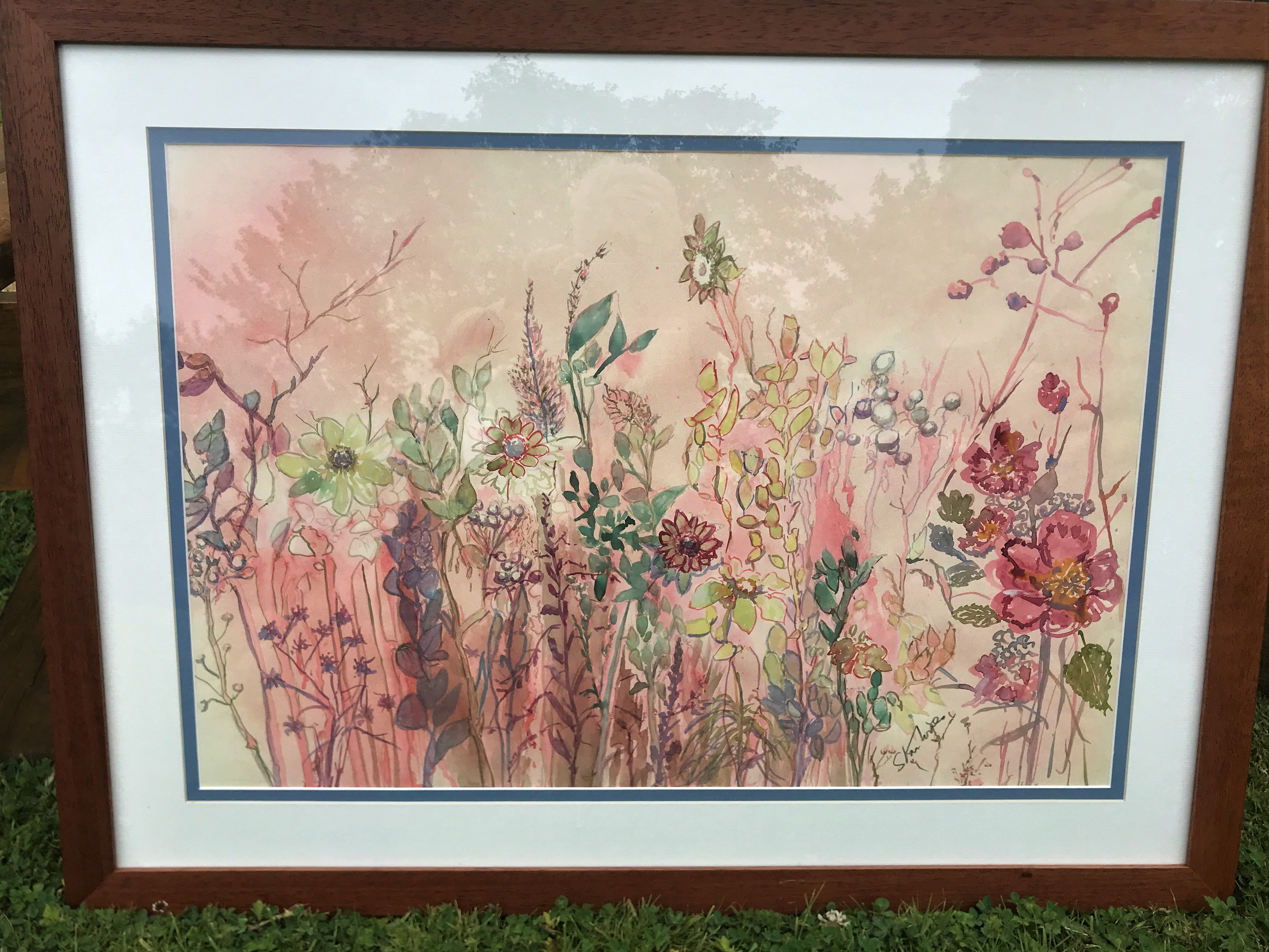
Summer Flowers

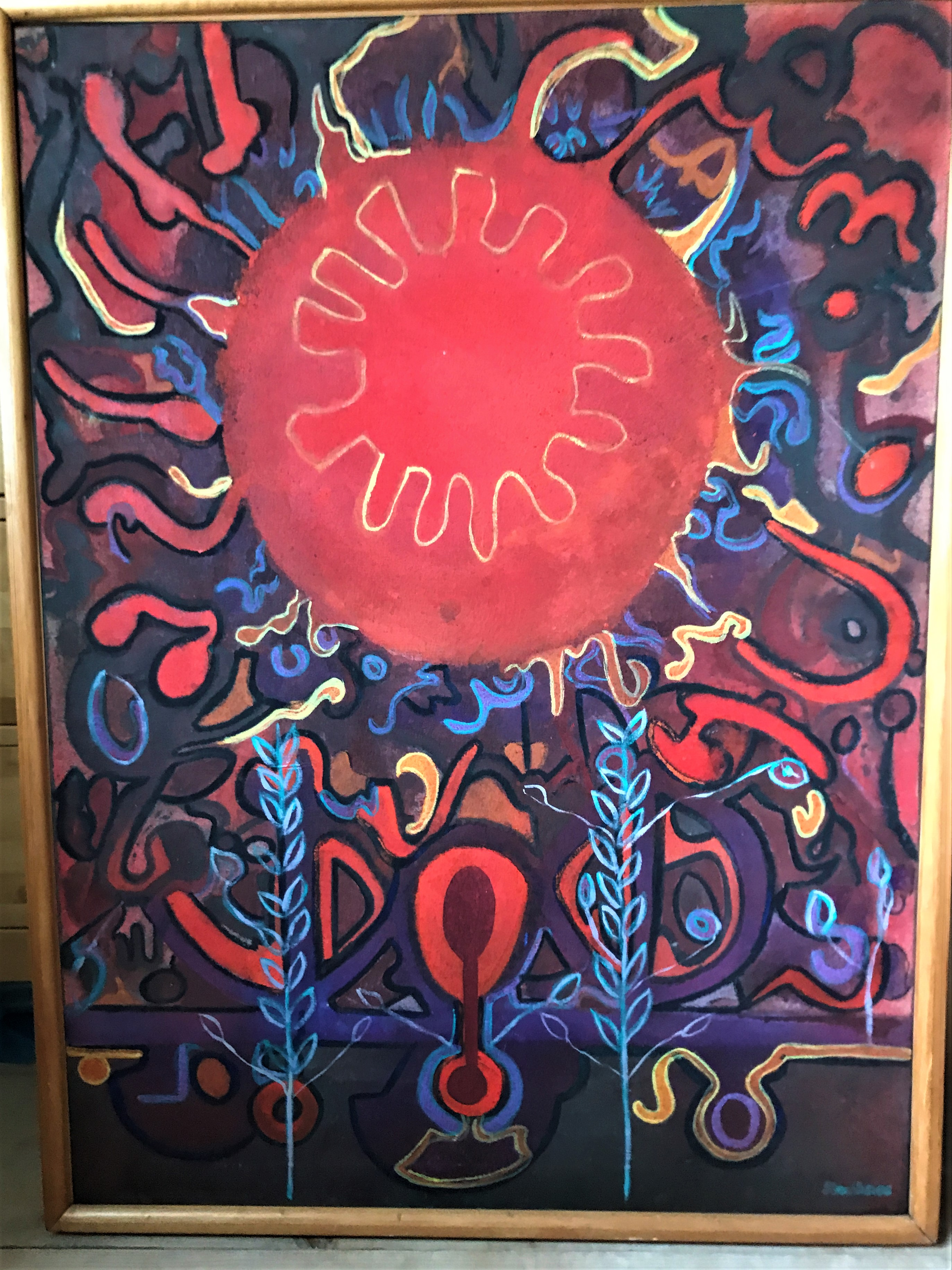
And the Sun of October Summery (Dylan Thomas)

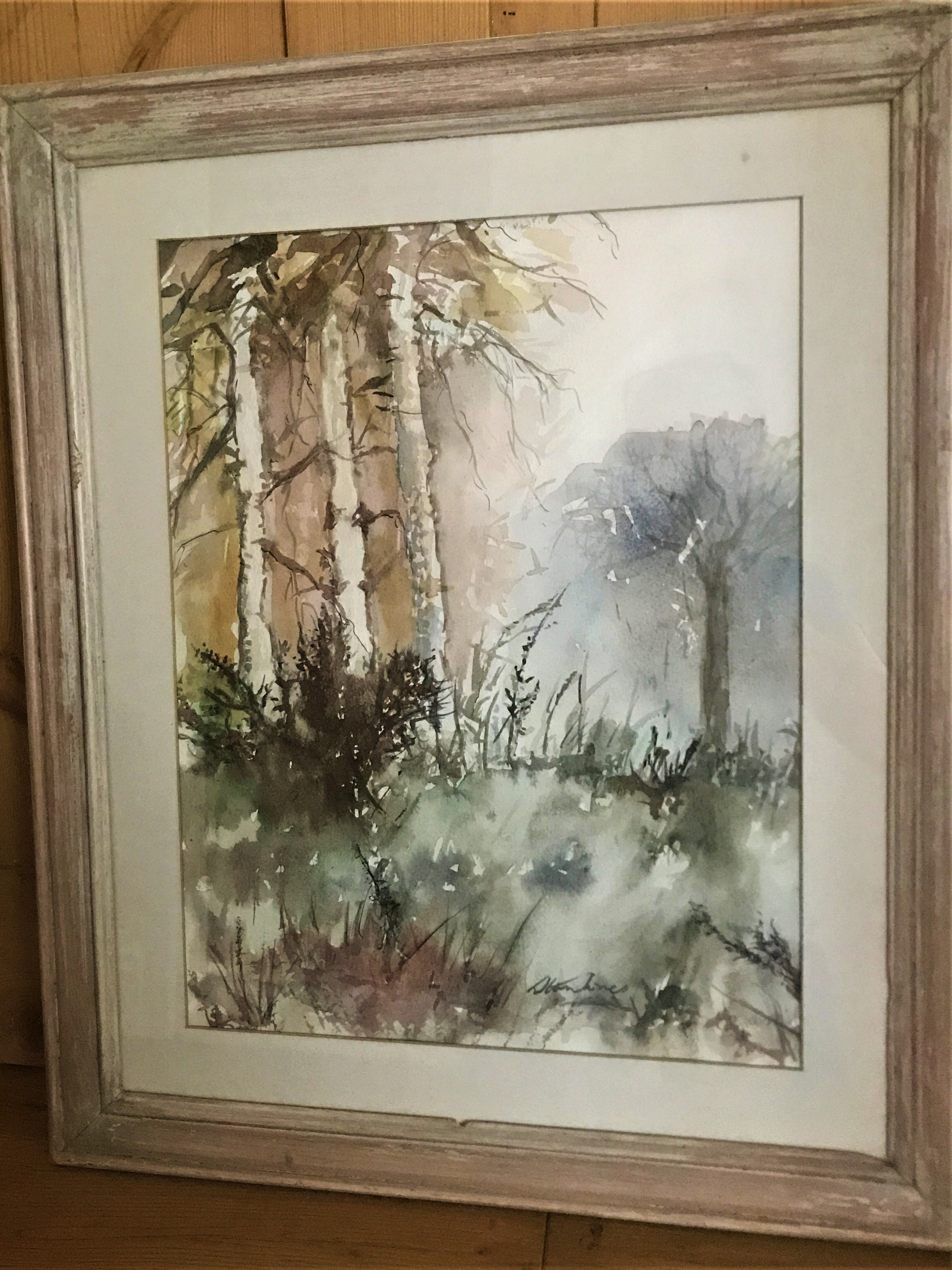
Gwrychoedd
