= John Rowlands (Giraldus) =

Welsh antiquarian and educator (1824–1891)

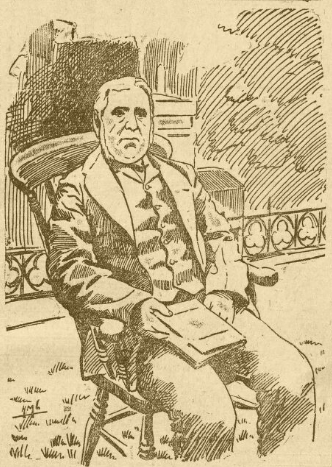
John Rowlands (Giraldus)

John Rowlands (pen name, "Giraldus"; 1824 – 4 July 1891) was a Welsh antiquary and educator, a literary man who wrote several interesting things in English and Welsh, and was an occasional contributor to the daily and weekly journals of the day.

== Biography ==
He was born at Nanteos Arms, Llanbadarn Fawr, Ceredigion. He was one of the first students who entered Carmarthen College, and one of the first who went out as pioneers of education in South Wales, when schoolmasters' salaries ranged from thirty pounds to forty pounds a year. During his early years, he served as chief librarian to Sir Thomas Phillipps, Middle Hall, Cheltenham.

Rowlands was a schoolmaster by profession, and in that capacity, he spent 10 years at Rumney; 16 years at Dinas Powys; and he spent some years also at Risca and Bedwas in a similar capacity. He established ten new schools in localities where there were no schools before. He carried one school on for 12 months without receiving any salary.

He received his pension from the Education Department, according to the code, for his services as a schoolmaster for nearly 40 years. His other services were enumerated by the Rector of Merthyr Tydfil and others, in the Western Mail and other papers, when he had a paralytic seizure, 10 years before his death, which left his left side in a helpless condition. He died in Cardiff, leaving a wife and daughters. There was at least son, John D. Rowlands, of Treherbert.

== Bibliography ==
- Wilkins, Charles; Harris, James (1885a). The Red Dragon: The National Magazine of Wales. Daniel Owen, Howell and Company.
- Wilkins, Charles; Harris, James (1885b). The Red Dragon (Public domain ed.). Daniel Owen, Howell and Company.
