= Brian Lightman =

British trade union leader (born 1955)

Brian Peter Leon Lightman FRSA (born 15 June 1955) is a British trade union leader who is the former General Secretary of the Association of School and College Leaders (ASCL, based in Leicester). The ASCL has around 18,000 teachers.

== Early life ==
He attended Westminster City Grammar School from 1966 to 1973. At the University of Southampton he gained a BA in German in 1978 and a Modern Languages PGCE in 1979.

== Career ==
He taught German and French from 1979 to 1984 at Hazelwick School in Crawley in West Sussex. From 1989 to 1991 he was Curriculum Development Manager and from 1991 to 1995 Deputy Head at St Martin's School, Brentwood. From 1995 to 1999 he was Headmaster at Llantwit Major School in the Vale of Glamorgan, and from 1999 to 2010 at St Cyres School.

=== ASCL ===
He was a representative for the Secondary Heads Association, being the Welsh representative of the National Council from 1998 to 2010. He was President from 2007 to 2008. He became General Secretary of the ASCL on 1 September 2010. He succeeded John Dunford, who had been there since 1998, and who is now involved with the pupil premium. On 28 January 2016 he left his position, and was succeeded by Malcolm Trobe, the Headmaster of Malmesbury School (former Malmesbury Grammar School).

In January 2006 the Secondary Heads Association became the ASCL; the Secondary Heads Association had been formed in 1977

== Personal life ==
He married Eva in 1981. They have four daughters. He currently lives off the B582 in the south-east of Leicester near the University of Leicester Botanic Garden. Until recently he lived in Lisvane, in the north of Cardiff.

Trade union offices
| Preceded by Sir John Dunford | General Secretary of the Association of School and College Leaders (ASCL); September 2010 - January 2016 | Succeeded by Malcolm Trobe |
| Preceded by | President of the ASCL; 2007 – 2008 | Succeeded by |
