= John Isaacs (disambiguation) =

John Isaacs (1915–2009) was an American professional basketball player who was inducted into the Basketball Hall of Fame.

John or Jon Isaacs may also refer to:

- John Alfred Isaacs (c. 1861–1944), Victoria, Australia politician
- John Dove Isaacs (1919–1980), American engineer and oceanographer
- John O. Isaacs (1920–2001), English aeronautical engineer
- Jon Isaacs (born 1949), Australian politician

== See also ==
- John Isaac (disambiguation)
