= Audrey Evelyn Jones =

English teacher and campaigner for women's rights

Audrey Jones
- Born: Audrey Evelyn Jones; 15 October 1929; Bushey, Hertfordshire, England
- Died: 16 August 2014 (aged 84); Wales, United Kingdom
- Occupations: teacher and women's right campaigner

Audrey Evelyn Jones (15 October 1929 – 16 August 2014) was an English teacher and campaigner for women's rights. She joined the staff of the St Cyres School in the Vale of Glamorgan in 1960 and rose to the position of deputy head teacher. During her career, Jones encouraged young girls to study mathematics and art to combat sexism in education, worked to further girls' education and on sex discrimination research in schools. In retirement she focused on campaigning for women's rights with the Wales Assembly of Women (WAW) on the world scene and through the Vale of Glamorgan Labour Party. The WAW established the Audrey Jones Memorial Awards for Research in her honour and her documents and personal papers were deposited at the Glamorgan Archives

== Family background and education ==
Audrey Evelyn Jones was born in Bushey, Hertfordshire, England on 15 October 1929. She was the oldest of three children to the police officer John Henry Reed and the newsagent Evelyn Mary Reed (née Tofield). Jones' parents were married at the St George's Hanover Square Church in 1928. She had a younger brother, Bernard, and a younger sister, Marion. The family moved to Essex after the death of her mother in 1938 and her father took up a job in the industry of radio engineering. Jones enrolled at Chelmsford County High School for Girls and admired its headteacher Geraldine Cadbury. She later went on to graduate from the University of Southampton. Additionally Jones completed a postgraduate certificate in education at the University of Manchester.

== Teaching career ==
In 1960 she joined the staff of the St Cyres School in the Vale of Glamorgan. Jones gained the reputation as "an uncompromising" champion of girls' education and rose to the position of deputy headteacher, a distinction that few woman earned in comprehensive schools of the 1980s. She encouraged young girls to study science and mathematics in an effort to combat sexism in the education system and fostered art and music appreciation. Jones worked with the National Union of Teachers to further girls' education and research on sex discrimination in schools. She co-founded the Wales Women's Rights Committee (WWRC), which petitioned the European Parliament on giving women workers equal treatment to men in 1975. Jones authored a report on the proportion of female secondary school head teachers in Wales for a conference at Nairobi in 1984. That year, the WWRC evolved into Wales Assembly of Women (WAW) and it became her primary campaign platform.

== Retirement from education and death ==
Following her retirement from teaching in 1990, Jones focused more on campaigning for women's rights with various organisations. She represented the WAW in the preparation for the World Conference on Women, 1995 in Beijing that led to the foundation of the Beijing Declaration and Platform for Action. Jones regularly attended sessions in New York City to review on the progress that the Beijing conference had made. Entering Welsh Devolution in 1999 Jones became an impassioned campaigner to persuade the National Assembly for Wales to commit to equal opportunity and marched publicly in her effort to persuade Welsh Labour to adopt constituency twinning to prompt the first Assembly to have gender equality. She campaigned through the Vale of Glamorgan Labour Party, serving on its general committee and the executive, and argued for women's views to be heard to promote equality.

Jones collected the works of Welsh contemporary artists and was chair of the Women's Arts Association. She was a founder member of the Women's Archive Wales and was part of the Fawcett Society. In 2003, Jones authored a paper on Violence Against Women. Eight years later, she was one of 60 feminists selected for interview by the British Library for its Sisterhood and After: The Women's Liberation Oral History Project to document activist's memories of seeking political and social equality during the 1970s and the 1980s. Jones became unwell after returning from a meeting in London to prepare for an international conference of the Convention on the Elimination of All Forms of Discrimination Against Women and died of a heart condition on 16 August 2014. She was given a humanist funeral service and was later buried in the Cardiff Natural Burial Meadow.

== Personal life ==
She married the Welsh-born Hugh Gabriel Jones in 1951 and they had a son, Robert. The family relocated to Wales in 1960 as Hugh had become the head of transport logistics for the multinational chemical company Dow Corning.

== Legacy ==
Jones was known as "a generous, witty and convivial person who worked towards achieving equality of opportunity for all." As an advocate against sexism in secondary education, she became an influence to Welsh students. In 2016, the WAW established the Audrey Jones Memorial Awards for Research in her honour. Jones' documents and personal papers were deposited by her biographer Jean Silvan Evans to the Glamorgan Archives in April 2018.
