= Association of School and College Leaders =

Professional association and trade union

- Formation: 2006; 20 years ago
- Purpose: Professional association and trade union for school and college leaders
- Headquarters: Peat House, Waterloo Way, Leicester, United Kingdom
- Region served: United Kingdom
- Members: ▼24,778 (2024)
- General Secretary: Pepe Di'Iasio
- President: Dr Jo Rowley
- Affiliations: Girls' Schools Association (GSA), Headmasters' and Headmistresses' Conference (HMC), School Leaders Scotland (SLS), The Society of Heads (SofH)
- Website: ascl.org.uk

The Association of School and College Leaders (ASCL), formerly the Secondary Heads Association (SHA), is a UK professional association and trade union for leaders of schools and colleges.

== History ==
The Association of Head Mistresses (AHM) was founded in 1874. The Headmasters' Association (HMA) was founded in 1890. The Secondary Heads Association was formed in 1977 by the amalgamation of these two organisations. In 1983, deputy heads were allowed to join, with other senior teaching staff following in the early 1990s and business managers in 2005. By 2005, two-thirds of the membership were not heads but other senior staff, and the association also had a membership in the college sector, so the name was changed in January 2006 to the current name.

== Membership ==
The ASCL's membership is formed of headteachers, principals, deputy heads, vice-principals, assistant heads, assistant principals, business managers and other senior post holders in schools and colleges. There are also some members in other education posts of similar seniority. ASCL has accepted members from primary schools since July 2015. It has members in every type of school including community, foundation, trust, academy, voluntary, independent, grammar, comprehensive, and special schools, and also in FE and sixth form colleges both maintained and independent. It has at least one member from virtually all such schools and colleges, in the great majority including the headteacher or principal. Members in Wales and Northern Ireland are represented by ASCL Cymru and ASCL Northern Ireland respectively, and ASCL is affiliated to School Leaders Scotland (SLS).

== Structure ==
The Association of School and College Leaders has as its ruling body a group of elected members collectively known as council. It is at council that association policy is determined. It is from council that national officers, including the president, are elected. There are 40 staff at the association's HQ in Waterloo Way, Leicester, and a further 48 across the UK. ASCL has a training section called ASCL Professional Development.

== Past Presidents of ASCL ==
The current Presidential trio consists of Dr Jo Rowley (President), Gurpall Badesha (vice-president) and Manny Botwe (Immediate Past President).

ASCL Presidents:

- 2025/2026 Dr Jo Rowley
- 2024/2025 Manny Botwe
- 2023/2024 John Camp
- 2022/2023 Evelyn Forde
- 2021/2022 Pepe Di'Iasio
- 2020/2021 Richard Sheriff
- 2019/2020 Rachael Warwick
- 2018/2019 Richard Sheriff
- 2017/18 Carl Ward
- 2016/17 Sian Carr
- 2015/16 Allan Foulds
- 2014/15 Peter Kent
- 2013/14 Sir Ian Bauckham
- 2012/13 Sir Michael Griffiths
- 2011/12 Dame Joan McVittie
- 2010/11 John Fairhurst
- 2009/10 John Morgan
- 2008/09 Jane Lees
- 2007/08 Brian Lightman
- 2006/07 Malcolm Trobe
- 2005/06 Sue Kirkham

== Affiliations ==
ASCL has corporate membership agreements with HMC, GSA, SLS and SofH.
