= Stan Jones (Australian rules footballer) =

Australian rules footballer, born 1908

Personal information
- Full name: Stanley Bruce Jones
- Born: 15 October 1908; Scarsdale, Victoria
- Died: 20 October 1972 (aged 64); Robinvale, Victoria
- Original team: Preston

Playing career^{1}
Years	Club	Games (Goals)
1931	Fitzroy	1 (0)
- ^{1} Playing statistics correct to the end of 1931.

Stanley Bruce Jones (15 October 1908 – 20 October 1972) was an Australian rules footballer who played with Fitzroy in the Victorian Football League (VFL).

Jones was cleared to North Wangaratta in the Ovens & King Football League in 1932 and played for the O&KFL in a match against Hawthorn the same year.
