= Gaetano De Gennaro =

Italian-Brazilian painter

Gaetano de Gennaro
- Born: 1 March 1890; Naples
- Died: 21 May 1959 (aged 69); São Paulo

Signature
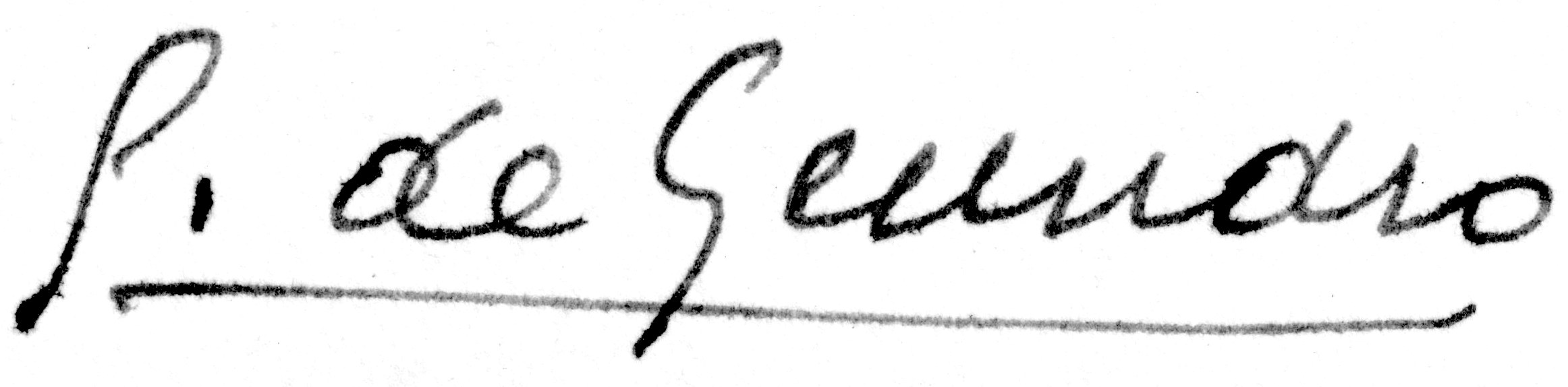

Gaetano de Gennaro (Naples, 1 March 1890 — São Paulo, 21 May 1959) was an Italian-Brazilian artist, sculptor.

== Life and work ==
Gaetano de Gennaro was born in Naples in March, 1890. He was a painter sculptor and teacher. He studied with his uncle, Luís Barone in Naples. He then went to Paris to study with Alberto Besnard, whose influence is seen in his work. He studied sculpture in Grenoble with Urban Basset and at the College of Decorative Arts in Nice. During his life he lived in Italy, Switzerland, France, England, Wales, Ireland and Brazil.

== Ireland ==
During World War II De Gennaro lived in Ireland from 1940 until c 1946. He was essentially a refugee and spent most of it in Ireland where he painted many portraits, mainly pastels, of both famous Irish people, such as Sean Keating, the opera soprano Margaret Burke Sheridan whose portrait is on display in the Gaiety Theatre and his portrait of Douglas Hyde, first President of Ireland hangs in Áras an Uachtaráin, the president residence. Some of his pastel portraits were included in the April 1943 Royal Hibernian Academy's An Exclusive Exhibition where Thomas MacGreevy compared his work to the earlier 20th century artists Philip de László and Jean Boldini. In 1942 a monograph of his works Gaetano de Gennaro: pastels and paintings, was published and the following year his works were in a one-man show in the Shelbourne Hotel.

De Gennaro's works are held in a number of Irish public collections, such as the Crawford Municipal Gallery, Cork, Hugh Lane Municipal Gallery and National Gallery of Ireland, both in Dublin.

== Brazil ==
He left Ireland for Brazil in about 1946. The Brazilian painter, Ernesto Lia, who was also a pastel painter like De Gennaro studied in his studio in Sao Paulo. He worked there until his death in 1959.
