= High Performance Computing Wales =

High Performance Computing Wales (HPC Wales) was a £44million five-year project (2010–2015) to provide Wales with a world class facility in High Performance Computing, accessible to both academic and commercial organisations based in Wales. The project aimed to give Wales a supercomputing capacity and network at a scale not attempted anywhere else in the UK or Europe. It is being followed by another five-year, £15million programme of investment called Supercomputing Wales.

HPC Wales invested in state-of-the-art computing technology, infrastructure and facilities on a pan-Wales basis, high level skills development and training. It was estimated that the project would result in the creation of over 400 jobs.

The project is financially supported by:

- £19m from ERDF and ESF European funds channelled through the Welsh European Funding Office
- £10m from the Department for Business, Innovation and Skills
- £4m from collaborating academic institutions
- £5m from the Welsh Assembly Government
- £2m private sector and research income

Announced in December 2009 by then Welsh Secretary Peter Hain, the project was formally launched in July 2010 by Deputy First Minister and Minister for the Economy and Transport, Ieuan Wyn Jones.

Two main computer hubs were created in Cardiff University and Swansea University, with connection to partners Aberystwyth, Bangor, Glamorgan, the University of Wales Alliance Universities and Technium business innovation centres around Wales. Professor Ian Cluckie was Chair of HPC Wales's Procurement Committee, and Pro Vice Chancellor for Science and Engineering at Swansea University.
