= John Noel Laughton Isaac =

John Noel Laughton Isaac (1911 – 3 September 1939) was a British solicitor and the first British serviceman to die during World War II. He was a pilot in the Royal Air Force Volunteer Reserve, and died when his plane crashed at Hendon.

Isaac was born in Dinas Powys, Glamorgan, Wales.
