= Fair Trade Wales =

Welsh organisation

- Founded: 2002
- Headquarters: Cardiff, Wales, UK
- Key people: Aileen Burmeister (National Coordinator)
- Website: www.fairtradewales.com

Fair Trade Wales is an organisation based in Wales that exists to grow, support and promote the Fair Trade movement in Wales. It is funded by the Welsh Government. In June 2008 it led Wales to become the world's first Fair Trade Nation and as of 2010 is working towards the second phase of Fair Trade Nation targets. 5 June 2023 marks 15 year's since becoming the world's first Fair Trade Nation and new indicators are being developed.

The organisation stages events during the annual Fairtrade Fortnight to raise awareness of Fairtrade in Wales. Fairtrade Fortnight usually runs for two weeks starting on the last Monday of February. It is an annual campaign to celebrate the movements successes and raise awareness of the differences buying Fairtrade makes for people and the planet.
