= John Isaac (photographer) =

Indian-born photographer and author

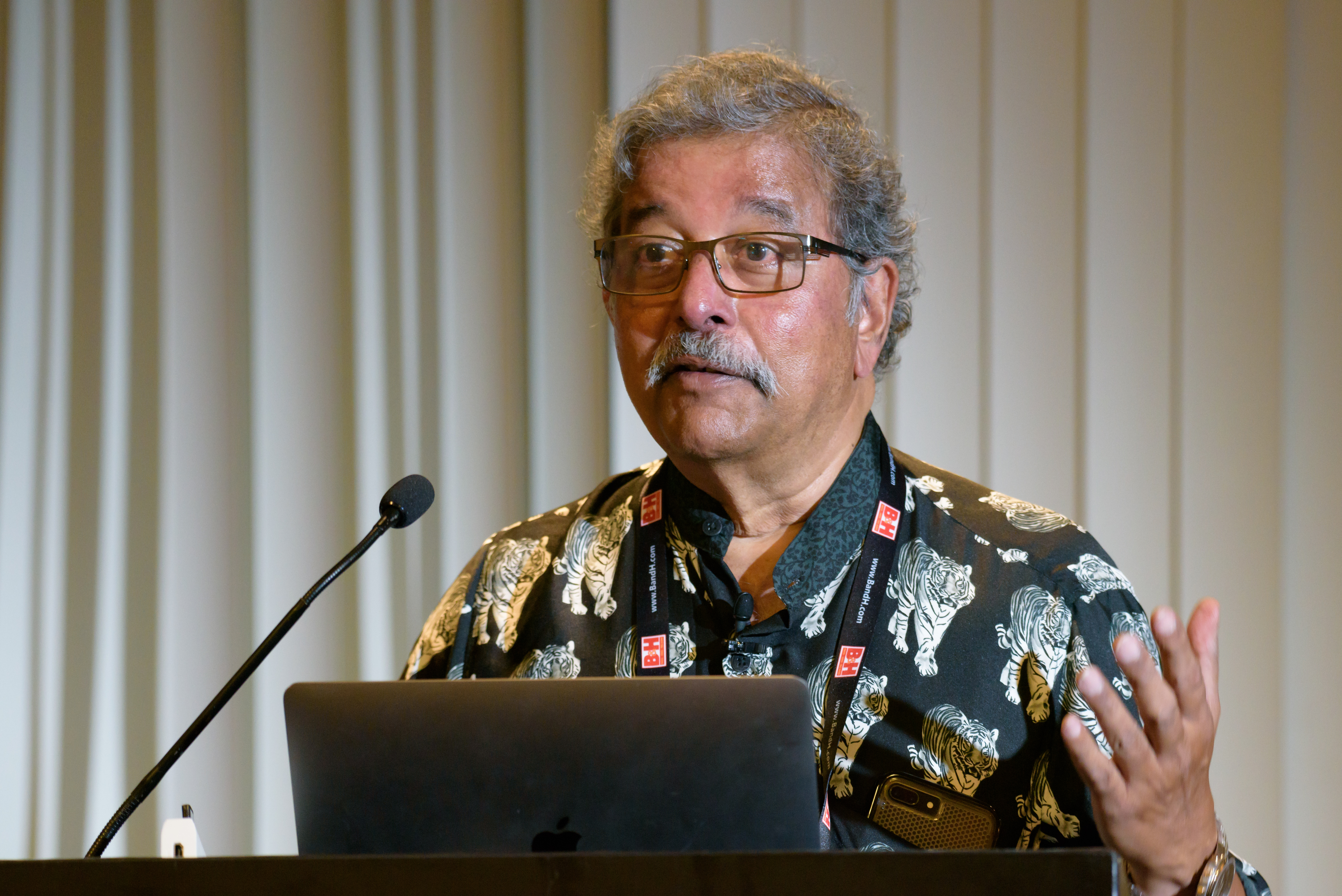
John Isaac in 2019

John Isaac (8 May 1943 – 1 November 2023) was an Indian photographer and author who lived in New York City for the better part of his career and life. In addition to being known for his work as a photojournalist for the United Nations, he is also known for his independent freelance work photographing celebrities, including Audrey Hepburn and Michael Jackson. More recently, he has been working mainly in wildlife and travel photography.

== Education ==
Isaac received a BSc in zoology from The New College, Madras University.

== Career ==
Isaac began his career at the UN as a messenger, moving on to become a darkroom technician, and eventually a photojournalist. He held this role for 20 years, eventually rising to the post of chief of the photo unit prior to his retirement from the UN in 1998.

In 2008, he co-authored a book, The Vale of Kashmir, about the people and landscape of Kashmir. In 2009, Outdoor Photographer magazine published a feature story about the book and Isaac, noting, "The book was a daunting undertaking, especially for a retired photographer."

In 2002, The Washington Post featured his photos from Africa in the paper and on its website.

Most recently, John appeared in a 2021 documentary about Audrey Hepburn's life.

John Isaac died on 1 November 2023.
