= Sara Maria Saunders =

Evangelist and author (1864–1939)

- Born: March 1864; Cwrt Mawr
- Died: January 1939; Liverpool

Sara Maria Saunders (March 1864 – January 1939), who wrote under the name S.M.S., was an evangelist and author. Raised as a Calvinistic Methodist and married to a minister, her writing was some of the most important to result from the 1904–1905 Revival. She worked with church groups, including Forward Movement, and Welsh Methodist missionaries.

== Early life ==
Saunders was born in March 1864 at Cwrt Mawr in Llangeitho, Ceredigion. Her father was Robert J. Davies, and she had nine siblings, including Annie Jane and John Humphreys Davies. Her family were very religious, and she attended a Methodist school in Liverpool, leading Saunders to experience a Christian religious conversion as a young child.

== Career ==
She wrote under the name S.M.S., her initials. Between 1893 and 1896, she published a series of stories in Y Drysorfa about the blessings experienced by residents of Llanestyn (based on Llangeitho) during the 1859 Revival. In 1897, they were published under the title Llon a Lleddf.

In 1903, she helped found the Women's Section of the Forward Movement in Llandrindod, as well as launching a branch of the Women of Swansea. She led a group of women for the Forward Movement to establish a permanent women's refuge in Canton, which opened in 1908.

In response to the 1904–1905 Revival, she published Y Diwygiad ym Mhentre Alun (transl. The Revival in Pentre Alun) in 1906–1907, and Llithiau o Bentre Alun (transl. Tales from Pentre Alun) in 1908, both published in the religious magazine Yr Ymwelydd Misol, who also later published Hen Bobl Llanestyn (transl. The Old People of Llanestyn) in 1914.

While living in New Zealand in 1914, she raised money for the foreign mission St David's Presbyterian Church in Auckland, more than doubling the amount raised in the previous year. She also included the number of girls attending Bible classes to fifty.

In 1919, she published A Bird's Eye View of Our Foreign Fields, a book about missionary work. When she moved to Liverpool in 1920, she worked with young women at the headquarters of the female Welsh Methodist missionaries.

She continued writing until 1930, with her work published in Y Gymraes, Y Drysorfa, Y Traethodydd, Yr Efengylydd, and Cymru: Heddyw ac Yforu. She also wrote in English, both translations of her Welsh work and original stories, with pieces published between 1892 and 1929 in The Christian Standard, Monthly Treasury, Young Wales, The Torch and The Treasury.

== Personal life and death ==
In 1887, she married John Maurice Saunders, son of David Saunders and a Calvinistic Methodist minister. They moved to Penarth in 1891 and then to Swansea by 1903, where they had two daughters. In 1912, they moved to New Zealand for six years. In 1918, due to Saunders' husband's ill health, they moved to Southern California, where he died in 1919. Saunders moved to Cardiff and then to Liverpool in 1920 with her daughters. Saunders died in January 1939 in Liverpool, and was buried in Allerton cemetery.

== Legacy ==
Saunders is regarded as the literary mother of her generation, and her work has been analysed byJane Aaron, among others. Wyn James, a professor of Welsh at Cardiff University, described Y Diwygiad ym Mhentre Alun as the most important fictional work to emerge from the 1904-05 Revival.

A collection of Saunders' stories was published as Llon a Lleddf a Storïau Eraill by Honno in 2012.
