= Dictionary of Welsh Biography =

Dictionary of biographies of Welsh men and women

The Dictionary of Welsh Biography (DWB) (also The Dictionary of Welsh Biography Down to 1940 and The Dictionary of Welsh Biography, 1941 to 1970) is a biographical dictionary of Welsh people who have made a significant contribution to Welsh life over seventeen centuries. It was first published in 1959, and is now maintained as a free online resource.

== Origins ==
Robert Thomas Jenkins was assistant editor, then joint editor, of Y Bywgraffiadur Cymreig and its English-language counterpart, the Dictionary of Welsh Biography, writing over 600 entries. His joint editor was John Edward Lloyd, but the Dictionary was not published until 1959, twelve years after his death. It is properly known as The Dictionary of Welsh Biography Down to 1940, and its supplementary volume as The Dictionary of Welsh Biography, 1941 to 1970 (2001). Originally published by the Honourable Society of Cymmrodorion, recent editions have been published by the University of Wales Press.

The Dictionary of Welsh Biography Down to 1940 contains about 4,900 entries within its 1157 pages on the careers and accomplishments of notable Welsh men and women who had distinguished themselves, providing a representative portrait of Welsh society and history up to the 20th century. However, it did not include anyone who was still living in 1940; its supplementary volume, The Dictionary of Welsh Biography, 1941 to 1970 did, containing an additional 600 entries within its 318 pages.

== Welsh Biography Online ==
The logo of Welsh Biography Online

The Welsh Biography Online resource has about 4,325 biographies online including clergy, princes, members of the gentry, poets and writers, government officials, ministers, artisans, sportsmen, workers, soldiers, industrialists and farmers.

Welsh Biography Online is a bilingual resource with every entry in Welsh and English. Welsh Biography Online combines the two volumes, The Dictionary of Welsh Biography Down to 1940 and The Dictionary of Welsh Biography, 1941–1970 with the three Welsh language volumes, Y Bywgraffiadur Cymreig hyd 1940, Y Bywgraffiadur Cymreig, 1941–1950 and Y Bywgraffiadur Cymreig, 1951–1970, all originally published by the Honourable Society of Cymmrodorion of London between 1953 and 2001.

The idea of transcribing The Dictionary of Welsh Biography into digital form came because of the constant enquiries the staff of the National Library of Wales receive from users and the constant use made of the Dictionary in the Library. The National Library of Wales also has a long and close association with The Dictionary of Welsh Biography. Several National Librarians have served as editors and many members of staff have undertaken editorial and research work for the publication. The National Library of Wales then decided to make the online resource a live data-base.

== Contributors ==
Authors of articles in the dictionary include:

- Idris Bell – Museum curator, a British papyrologist and a scholar of Welsh literature
- E. G. Bowen – Welsh geographer
- Geraint Bowen – Welsh poet and academic (1915–2011)
- William Llewelyn Davies – Welsh librarian (1887–1952)
- A. H. Dodd – British historian
- Mari Ellis – Welsh writer and women's rights activist
- Thomas Iorwerth Ellis – Welsh academic
- Emrys Evans – Welsh classicist and university principal (1891–1966)
- Gwynfor Evans – Welsh politician (1912–2005)
- Idris Foster – Welsh scholar (1911–1984)
- William Havard – Welsh bishop and rugby union footballer
- Edward Morgan Humphreys – British journalist and writer.
- David Jenkins – Welsh librarian
- Robert Thomas Jenkins – Welsh historian and academic (1881–1969)
- Bedwyr Lewis Jones – Welsh scholar, literary critic and linguist
- D. Gwenallt Jones – Welsh poet, critic, and scholar (1899–1968)
- E. D. Jones – Welsh librarian
- John Edward Lloyd – Welsh historian (1861–1947)
- John Morgan Lloyd – Welsh musician
- Peter Lord – British art historian (born 1948)
- David Mathew – British bishop and historian
- Roland Mathias – Welsh writer
- Derec Llwyd Morgan – Welsh academic and university vice-chancellor
- F. J. North – Geologist and museum curator
- John Dyfnallt Owen – Welsh poet and minister
- Thomas Parry – Welsh author and academic (1904–1985)
- Iorwerth Peate – Welsh writer; founder of the St Fagans National Museum of History
- Watkin William Price – Welsh schoolmaster and researcher
- B. R. Rees – Welsh classical historian
- Thomas Richards – Welsh author and librarian (1878–1962)
- Brynley F. Roberts – Welsh writer (1931–2023)
- Lawrence Thomas – Welsh archdeacon
- David Williams – Welsh historian
- Glanmor Williams – Welsh historian
