= Meg Elis =

Welsh writer, translator and language activist

Meg Ann Elis (born 26 October 1950), also known as Marged Dafydd, Marged Elis or Margaret Dafydd, is a Welsh writer, translator and language activist. She stood unsuccessfully as a Plaid Cymru candidate for the Delyn constituency in the National Assembly for Wales election in 1999 and again in 2007.

== Life and work ==
Meg Elis was born into a Welsh-speaking family in Aberystwyth, the daughter of politician T. I. Ellis and his wife, Mari Ellis, and studied at Bangor University. She was a director of the translation company NEWID ("CHANGE"), and has worked as a Welsh/English translator, journalist and radio producer.

Elis worked as a full-time secretary of Cymdeithas yr Iaith Gymraeg (a direct action pressure group working to defend the Welsh language) in 1973 and 1974. During this time she took part in a 1973 Cymdeithas yr Iaith direct action protest against the television transmitter at Holme Moss, south Pennines in England in 1973. She was taken to court and received a six month suspended sentence. In 1974, Elis was again involved in further Cymdeithas protest action, this time at Aberystwyth Post Office. As a consequence of these actions, in 1975 Elis was sentenced to six months imprisonment at (the now closed) HMP Moor Court, an open prison for women located at Oakamoor, Staffordshire.

During the 1980s, she was a member of the protest group at the Greenham Common Women's Peace Camp.

In 1985, her novel, Cyn Daw'r Gaeaf won the Prose Medal, one of the major prizes at the National Eisteddfod in Rhyl. Her other works included Carchar and I'r Gad, both published by Y Lolfa. Her novels have been cited as good examples of the more controversial themes a younger generation of Welsh-language writers dealt with in the 1980s.
