= Anthony Leonard Harris =

British geologist (1935–2025)

Anthony Leonard Harris (11 March 1935 – 5 August 2025) was a British geologist and former president of the Geological Society of London (1990–92). Educated at the University of Wales, Aberystwyth, he was a Member of the Aberystwyth Old Students' Association and served as President (2008–10).

Harris died on 5 August 2025, at the age of 90.

Professional and academic associations
Preceded by Derek John Blundell	President of the Geological Society of London; 1990–1992	Succeeded by Charles David Curtis
Preceded by Fariz Abu Bakar	President of the Aberystwyth Old Students' Association; 2008–2010	Succeeded by Kay S. Powell
