= Mars-Jones =

Mars-Jones is a surname. Notable people with the surname include:

- William Mars-Jones (1915–1999), Welsh barrister and High Court judge
- Adam Mars-Jones (born 1954), British novelist and literary critic, son of the above
