= Robert J. Davies =

British politician

Robert Joseph Davies, of Cwrtmawr, Llangeitho (2 August 1839 – 6 May 1892) was a leading figure in the political and religious life of Cardiganshire and in the Calvinistic Methodist denomination. He was the father of John Humphreys Davies, Annie Jane Hughes Griffiths, and Sara Maria Saunders.

Davies was born on 2 August 1839 at Llanbadarn Fawr, the son of Robert and Eliza Davies. His mother was the daughter of David Charles of Carmarthen, a pioneer of the Calvinistic Methodist denomination in Wales. Davies's status within his denomination was further strengthened by his marriage in 1863 to Frances Humphreys of Llandyfaelog, Carmarthenshire, who was the great-granddaughter of Peter Williams. Williams had been responsible for one of the most popular editions of the Welsh language Bible in the late eighteenth century. In 1873 Davies became treasurer of the Calvinistic Methodist General Assembly.

== History ==
Robert J. Davies was educated at the University College London and at the Royal Agricultural College in Cirencester. He became a Justice of the Peace for Cardiganshire in 1870. Following his return to Cardiganshire he spent the rest of his life on the small estate of Cwrt Mawr, Llangeitho. He became a prominent figure in the political life of the county and an active Liberal. The county seat had been famously captured at the 1868 General Election by Evan Matthew Richards of Swansea and was won in 1880 by David Davies, Llandinam who was a close friend of R. J. Davies. Consequently, in 1886, when David Davies broke with Gladstone over Irish Home Rule, R. J. Davies supported the Liberal Unionist cause and, at a meeting in Aberystwyth, was instrumental in forming a joint committee of Conservatives and Liberal Unionists to promote his candidature. In 1889, Davies stood for election at the first Cardiganshire County Council elections but was defeated. Three years later, however, he was returned unopposed. He is described as an Unionist on that occasion although it was said that there were signs of his returning to the Liberal Party before the end of his life. He was also a member and chairman of the Tregaron Board of Guardians.

On the death of Henry Richard in 1888 a campaign was immediately launched to erect a statue in his memory at Tregaron. Davies was instrumental in this campaign as secretary to the local committee. The campaign was successful and the statue holds pride of place until today.

He died suddenly on 6 May 1892, following a Guardians meeting at Tregaron. His funeral at Llangeitho attracted a large congregation and the presence of leading figures in Welsh nonconformity, such as Thomas Charles Edwards (his second cousin) and Thomas Levi, as well as numerous county councillors and other public figures, demonstrated the status he had achieved in Cardiganshire society.

He and his wife had ten children together and several became significant figures. He was succeeded as a county councillor by his son, John Humphreys Davies. His daughter Annie was active in the League of Nations. She married the politician and Cymru Fydd leader T. E. Ellis and after his death, Rev. Peter Hughes Griffiths.
