= Dafydd Llwyd Mathau =

Welsh poet, fl. 1601–1629

Dafydd Llwyd Mathau (fl. 1601–1629) was a 17th-century Welsh poet and strolling minstrel. It was thought by the bibliographer John Humphreys Davies (1871–1926) that he may have been from the Llangeitho area of Ceredigion (Cardiganshire). Mathau's works, written in Welsh, include poems in praise of several prominent Welsh families and a number of love poems. He is also known to have composed an awdl-style verse in 1611.
