= Arshad Ayub (educator) =

Malaysian academician and educator (1928–2022)

Yang Amat Berbahagia Tun Dato' Seri Utama Arshad Ayub SSM SPSK SUNS SPMS PSM PNBS DPMJ DPMP DPMT DSAP PGDK JMN
- ارشد ايوب

Pro-Chancellor of Universiti Teknologi MARA
- In office 31 March 2000 – 14 June 2022
- Chancellor: Salahuddin (2000–2001); Sirajuddin (2001–2006); Mizan Zainal Abidin (2006–2011); Abdul Halim (2011–2016); Muhammad V (2016–2019); Abdullah (2019–2022)

Personal details
- Born: 15 November 1928 Muar, Johor, Unfederated Malay States, British Malaya
- Died: 14 June 2022 (aged 93) Kuala Lumpur, Malaysia
- Resting place: Shah Alam Royal Mausoleum, Selangor
- Spouse: Zaleha Mohd Arshad (m. 1960)
- Children: 7
- Education: National University of Singapore; University of Putra Malaysia; Aberystwyth University; International Institute for Management Development
- Occupation: Academician, educator

Arshad bin Ayub (Jawi: أرشد بن أيوب; 15 November 1928 – 14 June 2022) was a Malaysian academician and educator. He was a founding father of the Universiti Teknologi MARA (UiTM), Malaysia's largest higher learning institution, where he was its director from 1967 to 1975, later served as its Pro-Chancellor from 2000 until his death in 2022. He was widely known as the national education icon.

In 2013, Arshad was an Merdeka Award recipient under the Education and Community category.

== Early life and education ==
Arshad was born in Muar, Johor, on 15 November 1928, in a family of moderate rubber tappers. He was the eldest son, and he was brought up in an atmosphere of hardship and poverty. After the death of his parents, he was assigned the responsibility of raising his four siblings.

Arshad received his primary education at Sekolah Kebangsaan Parit Keroma, Muar, Johor. He received his secondary education at the Muar High School, Johor. Subsequently, he attended the University of Malaya, Singapore (present day National University of Singapore) from 1949 to 1951. He received Diploma in Agriculture from the College of Agriculture, Serdang, Selangor (present day University of Putra Malaysia) in 1954. The previous year, he had been awarded a Colonial and Development scholarship to study at the University of Wales, Aberystwyth, UK (present day Aberystwyth University). He graduated there with an honours degree in Economics and Statistics in 1958. In 1964, he obtained a diploma in Business Administration from the Management Development Institute, Lausanne (present day International Institute for Management Development). He was a Member of the Aberystwyth Old Students' Association and was elected as President (2001–02).

== Career ==
Arshad was Pro-Chancellor of the Universiti Teknologi MARA (UiTM) from 2000 until his death in 2022. He was also Chairman of PFM Capital Propriety Limited, Chairman of AmanahRaya Investment Bank Limited and Chairman of the Board of Directors of the University of Malaya.

== Honours ==
=== Honours of Malaysia ===
- Malaysia
  - Companion of the Order of the Defender of the Realm (JMN) (1971)
  - Commander of the Order of Loyalty to the Crown of Malaysia (PSM) – Tan Sri (1980)
  - Grand Commander of the Order of Loyalty to the Crown of Malaysia (SSM) – Tun (2020)
- Sabah
  - Commander of the Order of Kinabalu (PGDK) – Datuk (1975)
- Pahang
  - Knight Companion of the Order of Sultan Ahmad Shah of Pahang (DSAP) – Dato'
- Terengganu
  - Knight Commander of the Order of the Crown of Terengganu (DPMT) – Dato'
- Kelantan
  - Knight Grand Commander of the Order of Loyalty to the Crown of Kelantan (SPSK) – Dato' (1981)
- Perlis
  - Knight Commander of the Order of the Crown of Perlis (DPMP) – Dato' (1974)
- Johor
  - Knight Commander of the Order of the Crown of Johor (DPMJ) – Dato'
- Sarawak
  - Knight Commander of the Most Exalted Order of the Star of Sarawak (PNBS) – Dato Sri (2007)
- Selangor
  - Knight Grand Commander of the Order of the Crown of Selangor (SPMS) – Dato' Seri (2009)
- Negeri Sembilan
  - Principal Grand Knight of the Order of Loyalty to Negeri Sembilan (SUNS) – Dato' Seri Utama (2013)

Academic offices
Preceded by	Pro-Chancellor of Universiti Teknologi MARA; 2000–2022	Succeeded by
Preceded by Lilian M. Jones	President of the Aberystwyth Old Students' Association; 2001–2002	Succeeded by Dr J. Gwyn Morgan
