= Welsh Agricultural College =

Welsh educational institution (1970–1995)

The Welsh Agricultural College (WAC) was established in Aberystwyth, Ceredigion, Wales, in 1970. In 1995, the WAC merged with the then University of Wales, Aberystwyth.

== Establishment ==
In an unusual arrangement, the college was financed through a joint committee composed of representatives of all the Welsh local authorities. Its original mission in 1970 was to provide vocational education in agriculture (NDA and HND) and for several years it provided National and Higher National Diploma courses. An HND took 4 years and included extensive work experience on farms.

The WAC shared a campus with the Welsh College of Librarianship at Llanbadarn. The first intake of 34 students was in 1971 when the buildings were unfinished. The College acquired Frondeg dairy farm and a beef and sheep unit at Tan y Graig.

Dr D.W. Dai Morris was the first principal of the WAC.

== Degrees and students ==
The WAC later diversified its provision to include courses in Countryside Management and Equine Studies. A degree scheme in Agriculture, offered jointly with the University of Wales, Aberystwyth’s Department of Agricultural Sciences, was established in 1982.

Students from this period were typically UK applicants who wanted an applied course, or had not gained places at more established agricultural colleges (Wye College, Royal Agricultural College in Cirencester, Harper Adams College etc.). Some were sons or daughters of Welsh farmers.

The college had a small contingent of young lecturing staff (Professor Wynne Jones OBE 1970s-1988, latterly Principal of Harper Adams College; Dr John Harries 1974-1995, former Principal of WAC and Pro-Vice Chancellor of Aberystwyth University).

== Disestablishment and merger ==
In 1995, the WAC merged with the then University of Wales, Aberystwyth's Department of Agricultural Sciences to form its Institute of Rural Studies, with Michael Haines appointed as its first director.

It was later renamed the Institute of Rural Sciences. In 2008, it was merged with the university's Institute of Biological Sciences and the independent Institute of Grassland and Environmental Sciences (IGER) to form the Institute of Biological, Environmental and Rural Sciences (IBERS).
