= David Nicholas (journalist) =

British television executive (1930–2022)

Sir David Nicholas CBE FRTS
- Born: 25 January 1930; Tregaron, Cardiganshire, Wales
- Died: 4 June 2022 (aged 92); Macclesfield, Cheshire, England
- Education: Neath Grammar School
- Alma mater: University College of Wales, Aberystwyth (BA)
- Occupation: Journalist
- Years active: 1953–1991
- Employer: ITN
- Spouse: Juliet Davies (m. 1952; died 2013)
- Children: 2

Sir David Nicholas CBE (25 January 1930 – 4 June 2022) was a British broadcast journalist, ITN editor-in-chief, chief executive (1977–1989) and chairman (1989–91).

== Early life ==
Nicholas was born in Tregaron, Cardiganshire, Wales on 25 January 1930. He was the son of Daniel Nicholas, a bank's chief cashier, and his wife Elizabeth (née Williams). He was brought up in Glynneath, Glamorgan, and attended Neath grammar school. After graduating in English (Bachelor of Arts) from the University College of Wales, Aberystwyth, and doing national service in the Army's education corps (from 1951 to 1953), Nicholas became a journalist. He worked on The Yorkshire Post, then worked on The Daily Telegraph as a subeditor.

== Career ==
Nicholas joined ITN in 1960 as a subeditor. He also did a weekend shift on The Observer. He worked his way up to chief sub and then deputy editor in 1963. He was the producer of ITN's News at Ten programme at its inception. He was editor-in-chief, and produced election night coverage from 1966 to 1987 as well as the Apollo Moon landing coverage, and ITN special programmes. He became chief executive of ITN from 1977 to 1989, and then chairman from 1989 until his retirement in 1991. He was also a director of Channel 4 from 1992 to 1997 and chair of Sports News TV from 1996 to 2003. He was Visiting Editor at the Graduate School of Journalism at Berkeley (from 1993) and the School of Journalism, University of Boulder, Colorado (from 1994). He was also Chairman of the Deptford Challenge Trust from 1996 to 2005 and a Member of the Council of Goldsmiths College, London, from 1996 to 2003.

== Personal life and death ==
Nicholas was married to Juliet Davies from 1952 until her death in 2013. The couple had two children. Nicholas died from colon cancer and Alzheimer's disease at a care home in Macclesfield, Cheshire, on 4 June 2022, aged 92.

== Awards ==
Nicholas received the Producers’ Guild Award in 1967 (for coverage of the return of Sir Francis Chichester). He also received Fellowship (FRTS) in 1980, the Cyril Bennett Award in 1985, the Judges' Award in 1991 and a Lifetime Achievement award from the Royal Television Society in 2012. He was awarded a CBE in the 1982 Birthday Honours and a Knight Bachelor in the 1989 Birthday Honours. He was created a Fellow of University College Aberystwyth and received an Honorary degree (LLD) from the University of Wales in 1990 and was also twice elected President of his university's Old Students' Association in 1990 and 1992. He was also awarded an honorary degree (DHL) from the Southern Illinois University in 2000. He also received the News World Lifetime Achievement Award in 2001 and was made an Hon. Fellow, of Goldsmiths College, London in 2004. He died on 4 June 2022 at the age of 92.

Media offices
Preceded by	Chairman of Independent Television News; 1989–1991	Succeeded by
Professional and academic associations
Preceded by Gareth Price	President of the Aberystwyth Old Students' Association; 1990–1991	Succeeded by Hugh Emlyn Hooson, Lord Hooson
Preceded by Hugh Emlyn Hooson, Lord Hooson	President of the Aberystwyth Old Students' Association; 1992–1993	Succeeded by Mair Waldo Thomas
