= E. D. Jones =

Welsh librarian

Evan David Jones CBE FSA (6 December 1903 – 7 March 1987) was the Librarian of the National Library of Wales in Aberystwyth from 1958 to 1969.

Jones was appointed Librarian of the National Library of Wales, the national legal deposit library of Wales, in 1958. A biographer, Jones wrote articles on Evan Lewis, and David Jones among others for the Dictionary of Welsh Biography.

Jones also wrote Victorian and Edwardian Wales from Old Photographs. He was the editor when the entire works of Welsh bard Lewis Glyn Cothi were published in 1953, through the cooperation of the National Library of Wales and the University of Wales Press Board.

He married Eleanor Ann Lewis, daughter of a master mariner of Aberystwyth, in 1933. They remained married until his death.

Academic offices
Preceded by Thomas Parry	Librarian of the National Library of Wales; 1958–1969	Succeeded by David Jenkins
