= Eric Sunderland =

Welsh anthropologist and academic

Eric Sunderland, CBE, FSB (18 March 1930 – 24 March 2010) was a Welsh anthropologist and academic. He served as Principal and then Vice-Chancellor of the University College of North Wales from 1984 to 1995, and Vice-Chancellor of the University of Wales from 1989 to 1991. He had previously taught at the University of Durham, where he had risen to be Professor of Anthropology (1971 to 1984) and Pro Vice-Chancellor (1979 to 1984). He was a Member of the Aberystwyth Old Students' Association and served as President (1986–87). In retirement, he held a number of royal appointments: he served as High Sheriff of Gwynedd for 1998/1999, and as Lord Lieutenant of Gwynedd from 2000 to 2006.

Academic offices
Preceded by Charles Evans	Principal/Vice-Chancellor; University College of North Wales; 1984–1995	Succeeded by Roy Evans
Professional and academic associations
Preceded by Thomas Ceiri Gruffydd	President of the Aberystwyth Old Students' Association; 1986–1987	Succeeded by Sir William Lloyd Mars Jones
