= Institute of Biological, Environmental and Rural Sciences =

Plant research institute in Wales

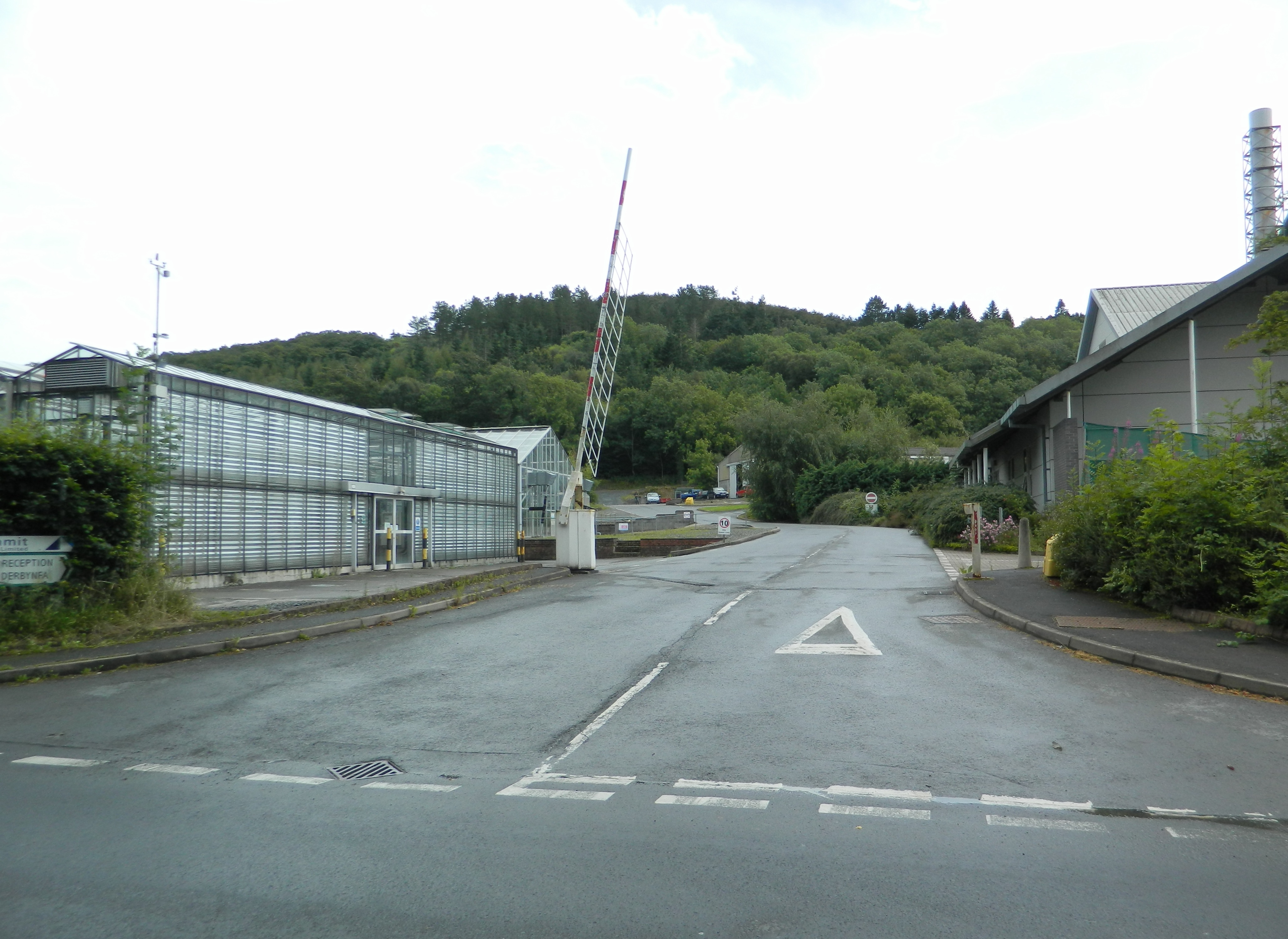
- Former names: Welsh Plant Breeding Station; Institute of Grassland and Environmental Research; Institute of Biological Sciences; Institute of Rural Sciences
- Type: Agricultural Sciences; Biological Sciences
- Established: 1919
- Affiliations: Aberystwyth University
- Director: Iain Donnison
- Location: Aberystwyth, Wales
- Campus: Gogerddan
- Website: www.aber.ac.uk/en/ibers/

The Institute of Biological, Environmental and Rural Sciences (IBERS) is an institute of Aberystwyth University. It is committed to ensuring humanity can sustainably produce the food, feed and plant-based industrial resources it needs.

As one of only eight research institutes funded by UKRI’s Biotechnology and Biological Sciences Research Council (BBSRC), IBERS provides the UK with a national capability in grassland and plant breeding science, supporting strategic sustainability goals and net zero targets. It has a remit for research, teaching and business innovation in the area of bio-sciences, plant breeding, land use and the rural economy.

== Sites ==
IBERS is currently situated on the Gogerddan campus, two miles to the North East of Aberystwyth, near Penrhyncoch and Bow Street.

== Research ==
IBERS research is focused on forage, food and fibre crops divided into the following research clusters:

- Forage Crops
- Grains for Health
- Industrial Crops
- Crop Genomics
- Biorefining and the Bioeconomy
- Agricultural Systems

The institute has a state of the art translational genomics facility and is home to the BBSRC National Plant Phenomics Centre. It also includes an advanced biorefining facility and a seed bank which safeguards one of the world’s largest collection of seeds from grasses, clover, oats and Miscanthus. IBERS also has extensive research farms, including the Upland Research Centre at Pwllpeiran. These cover more than 1,000 hectares and provide an altitudinal challenge gradient from sea level to 600m in elevation.

== Plant Breeding ==
IBERS has active breeding programmes for forage and amenity grasses, forage legumes, grain legumes, oats and miscanthus.

== History ==
IBERS' history is one of a complicated series of mergers.

=== University College of Wales (UCW) ===
The University College of Wales (UCW) opened in 1872 with classes in biological sciences starting in 1874. Its Department of Agriculture opened in 1891.

=== Welsh Plant Breeding Station (WPBS) ===
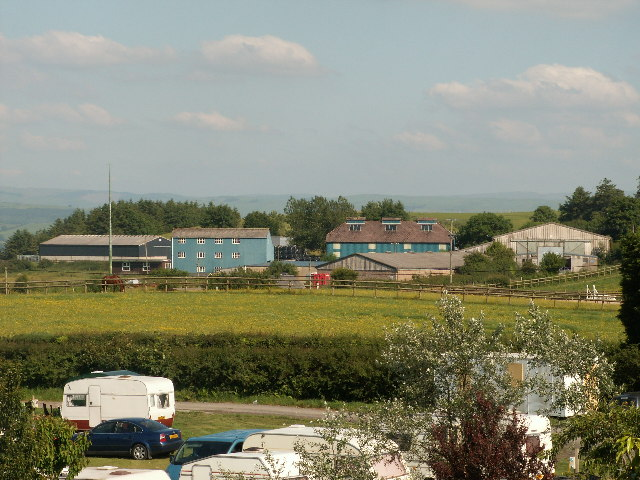
Frongoch Farm in 2005

In 1919 George Stapledon was appointed Professor of Agricultural Botany at UCW and was also made the Director of the Welsh Plant Breeding Station which was also established in 1919 thanks to an initial donation of £10,000 from Sir Laurence Philipps, 1st Bt., with a further £1,000 for the following ten years. The WPBS was initially based at Alexandra Road in Aberystwyth as a department of UCW, with land at Penglais Farm and Frongoch Farm. The station moved to new premises on Penglais hill in 1939, since renamed Aberystwyth University's Cledwyn building and housing various service departments of the university. In 1955 the institute was then moved to Plas Gogerddan, near Bow Street, Ceredigion. It was officially opened by the Queen.

=== Grassland Research Institute (GRI) ===
The Grassland Improvement Station was established at Drayton, near Stratford upon Avon, Warwickshire, England. In 1949 it moved to a new site at Hurley, Berkshire and was renamed the Grassland Research Institute (GRI). GRI acquired the North Wyke site in Devon in 1981.

=== Welsh Agricultural College (WAC) ===
In 1970, the Welsh Agricultural College (WAC) was founded in Llanbadarn Fawr, near Aberystwyth. WAC merged with the Agriculture department of UCW in 1995 to form its Institute of Rural Sciences.

=== Animal and Grassland Research Institute (AGRI) ===
In 1985, GRI and the National Institute for Research in Dairying were merged to form the Animal and Grassland Research Institute (AGRI).

=== Institute of Grassland and Animal Production (IGAP) ===
WPBS ceased to be part of UCW in 1987 as part of restructuring of the Agricultural and Food Research Council funded research. The WPBS facilities at Gogerddan and Bronydd Mawr and the AGRI sites at Hurley and North Wyke were combined with parts of the Poultry Research Centre at Roslin to form the Institute of Grassland and Animal Production (IGAP).

=== Institute of Grassland and Environmental Research (IGER) ===
Further restructuring took place three years later with cessation of pig research and the transfer of the poultry department to the Institute for Animal Physiology and Genetics Research at Roslin. The remaining part was Institute of Grassland and Environmental Research (IGER) retained the facilities at Gogerddan, North Wyke and Bronydd Mawr as well as the Hurley site which closed in 1992. At the same time farm facilities at Trawsgoed were acquired.

=== Institute of Biological, Environmental and Rural Sciences (IBERS) ===
In April 2008, IGER merged with Aberystwyth University's Institute of Biological Sciences and its Institute of Rural Sciences to form the Institute of Biological, Environmental and Rural Sciences, one of the largest departments for the life-sciences in the UK.

=== Institute of Biological, Environmental and Rural Sciences (IBERS) ===
In August 2022, IBERS divided into two entities within Aberystwyth University: IBERS became the research arm of this restructuring and an Institute in its own right, while the main teaching responsibilities are now separate within the Department of Life Sciences.

== Directors of the institute ==
=== Welsh Plant Breeding Station ===
- Sir George Stapledon 1919–1942
- T.J. Jenkin 1942–1950
- E.T. Jones 1950–1958
- P.T. Thomas 1958–1974
- J.P. Cooper 1975–1983
- R.Q. Cannell 1984–1987
- J.L. Stoddart 1987

=== Institute for Grassland and Animal Production ===
- J. Prescott 1987–1988
- J.L. Stoddart 1988–1990

=== Institute of Grassland and Environmental Research ===
- J.L. Stoddart 1990–1993
- Chris Pollock 1993–2007
- Mervyn Humphries 2007–2008

=== Institute of Biological, Environmental and Rural Sciences ===
- Wayne Powell 2008–2014
- Mike Gooding 2014–2019
- Iain Donnison 2019-
