= Aberystwyth Old Students' Association =

Welsh university alumni association

Old Students' Association Cymdeithas y Cyn-Fyfyrwyr
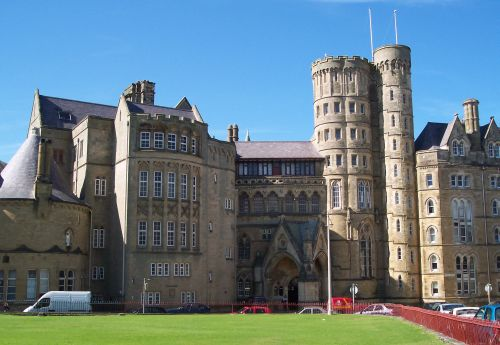
- Old College, Aberystwyth
- Abbreviation: OSA / CCF
- Established: 2 March 1892; 134 years ago
- Type: Alumni association
- Legal status: Non-profit organization
- Location: Aberystwyth University, Aberystwyth, Ceredigion
- Members: 10,000+
- Official language: English; Welsh
- President (106th): Dr Julie M. Finch
- Website: www.osaaber.org

Aberystwyth Old Students' Association (Welsh: Cymdeithas y Cyn-Fyfyrwyr Aberystwyth), founded in 1892, is Aberystwyth University's alumni association and is one of the oldest such associations in the United Kingdom. It currently has more than 10,000 Members and 100,000 Associate Members worldwide.

== History ==
It was founded on 2 March 1892, by a group of former students in Aberystwyth to mark St David's Day. The first President was the politician Thomas Edward Ellis MP and the first Vice-President was the College's Principal, Thomas Francis Roberts.

The Association has had a number of branches in various parts of Wales, England, Northern Ireland and overseas during various times during its history: the Oxford, Cambridge and London Branches were established before 1900, with Swansea, Cardiff and Northern England Branches created in 1899. Branches in India, Myanmar (Burma) and Sri Lanka (Ceylon) followed in 1923, Aberystwyth Branch was established in 1934, and the Malaysia Branch was established in 1992.

Celebrations for the OSA's Centenary took place in 1992 with various dinners and dances and the launch of the Alumni Magazine Prom. The 125th Anniversary was marked with a Gala Dinner.

== Activities ==
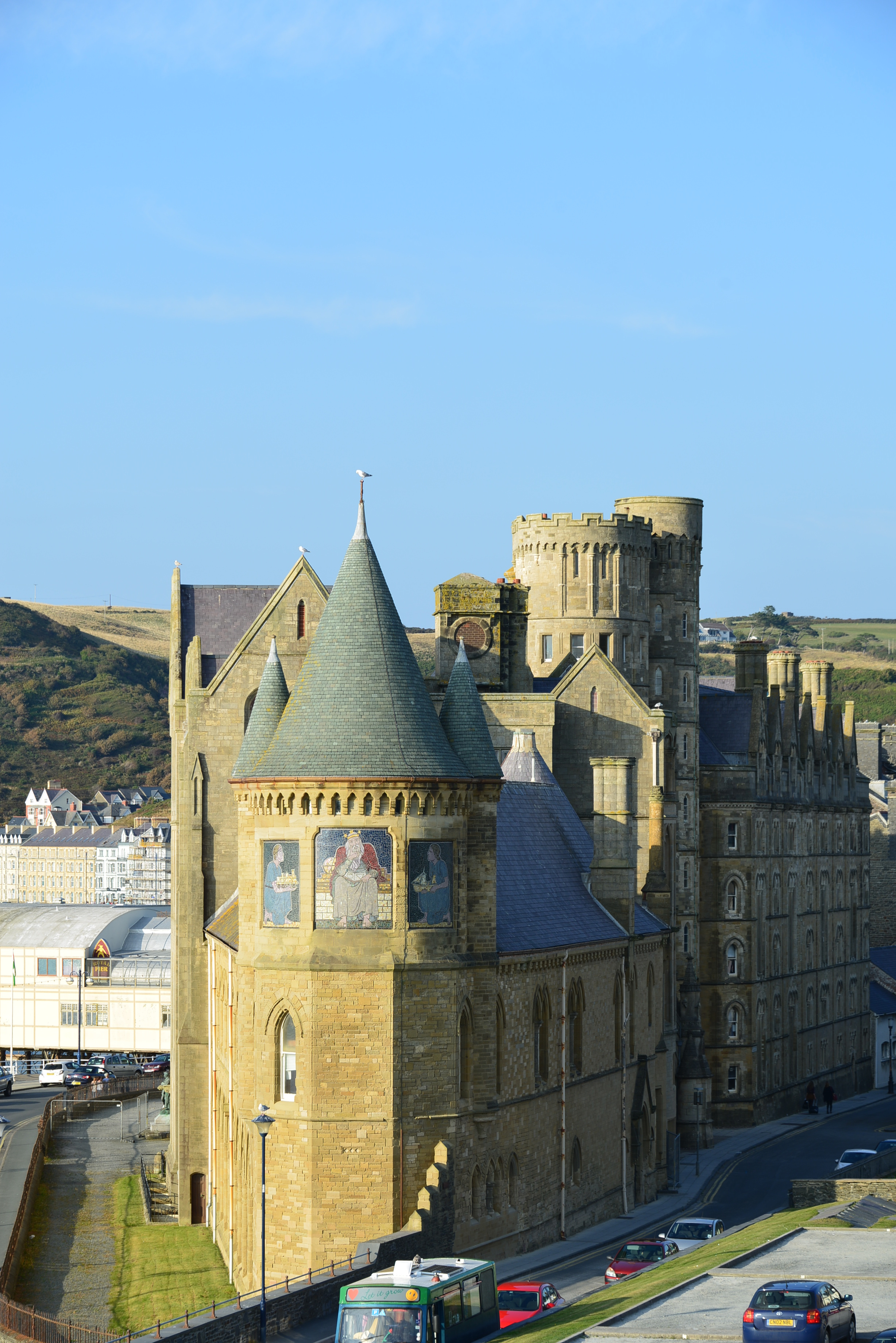
Old College, Aberystwyth

The Association (OSA), as an independent body, has supported the university throughout its history and has raised substantial sums to support the university's work.

Every June, the Association holds a Reunion in Aberystwyth. The OSA has also organised Public Lectures, such as the Llandaff Lectures at Howell's School in Cardiff and the Llandovery Lectures at Llandovery College.

== Members ==
All university alumni are automatically enrolled as Associate Members and Life Membership is open to all students and staff of Aberystwyth University. The Association's Members have included various distinguished Aberystwyth University alumni. Membership has grown from 329 Members in 1922 to 570 in 1939. In 1960, there were 898 Members and now more than 10,000.

== Presidents ==
- 1892–98 Thomas Edward Ellis
- 1898–1901 D. E. Jones
- 1901–2 Edgar William Jones (I)
- 1902–3 D. C. Roberts
- 1903–4 Frederick Daniel Chattaway
- 1904–5 T. R. Dawes
- 1905–6 A. M. Dobell
- 1906–7 Austin Keen
- 1907–8 John Humphreys Davies
- 1908–9 John Mortimer Angus
- 1909–10 C. P. Tremain
- 1910–11 Thomas Francis Roberts
- 1911–12 T. Campbell James (I)
- 1912–13 Mrs T. E. Ellis
- 1913–14 Thomas Jones
- 1914–20 Herbert John Fleure
- 1920–23 Henry Howard Humphreys
- 1923–24 Olive Wheeler
- 1924–25 Jenkin James
- 1925–26 Jack Edwards
- 1926–27 C. R. Chapple
- 1927–28 Mrs E. W. Dobbs
- 1928–29 Sir Edward John Russell
- 1929–30 Sir Calwaladr Bryner Jones
- 1930–31 William King
- 1931–32 Ernest Evans
- 1932–33 Edward Edwards
- 1933–34 D. J. Roberts
- 1934–35 Joseph Davies Bryan
- 1935–36 Howell E. James
- 1936–37 Mrs L. Jameson-Evans
- 1937–38 Maj. John Edwards
- 1938–39 Olive, Lady Stamp
- 1939–40 T. Lewis Old
- 1940–41 A. Pinsent
- 1941–42 Myfanwy Ellis
- 1942–43 Thomas Iorwerth Ellis
- 1943–44 Thomas James Jenkin
- 1944–45 I. C. Jones
- 1945–46 Winifred Hindle
- 1946–47 John Oswald Francis
- 1947–48 Humphrey D. Roberts
- 1948–49 R. Moelwyn Hughes
- 1949–50 E. Davies-Thomas
- 1950–51 Rev. G. A. Edwards
- 1951–52 Maj. Edgar William Jones (II)
- 1952–53 David Evans
- 1953–54 J. W. Fisher
- 1954–55 Tom Owen
- 1955–56 Elvet Lewis
- 1956–57 T. W. Evans
- 1957–58 C. W. Davies
- 1958–59 David Dilwyn John
- 1959–60 Sir David Hughes Parry
- 1960–61 Stanley G. Rees
- 1961–62 T. Campbell James (II)
- 1962–63 Sir David Lewis Evans
- 1963–64 David James Llewelfryn Davies
- 1964–65 Sir William John Pugh
- 1965–66 Walter Idris Jones
- 1966–67 Elwyn Davies
- 1967–68 William Thomas
- 1968–69 Sir Ben Bowen Thomas
- 1969–70 R. M. Cohen
- 1970–71 T. Evans
- 1971–72 Emrys George Bowen
- 1972–73 Mati Rees
- 1973–74 Sir Alun Talfan Davies
- 1974–75 Prof. D. W. T. Jenkins
- 1975–76 Cyril Kinsey
- 1976–77 Alun Bennett Oldfield-Davies
- 1977–78 Mary Llewelfryn Davies
- 1978–79 D. V. Leadbeater
- 1979–80 Eunice Jones
- 1980–81 B. A. Edwards
- 1981–82 Emrys Wynn Jones
- 1982–83 Cyrus G. Thomas
- 1983–84 Dilys Wynne Lloyd
- 1984–85 Emrys Jones
- 1985–86 Thomas Ceiri Gruffydd
- 1986–87 Eric Sunderland
- 1987–88 Sir William Lloyd Mars Jones
- 1988–89 Ifan Gruffydd Moelwyn Hughes
- 1989–90 Gareth Price
- 1990–91 Sir David Nicholas (I)
- 1991–92 Hugh Emlyn Hooson, Lord Hooson
- 1992–93 Sir David Nicholas (II)
- 1993–95 Mair Waldo Thomas
- 1995–96 Elystan Morgan, Lord Elystan-Morgan
- 1996–97 Dr Eric Thomas
- 1997–98 Rachel Bryan Davies
- 1998–2000 Kenneth M. Young
- 2000–01 Lilian M. Jones
- 2001–02 Tun Arshad bin Ayub
- 2002–03 Dr J. Gwyn Morgan
- 2003–05 H. Gethin Davies
- 2005–07 Stuart Owen-Jones
- 2007–08 Fariz Abu Bakar
- 2008–10 Anthony Leonard Harris
- 2010–12 Kay S. Powell
- 2012–14 Tom Morgan
- 2014–17 Stephen R. Lawrence
- 2017–18 John Frampton
- 2018–21 Gwenda M. Sippings
- 2021–25 Lauren Marks
- 2025–present Dr Julie M. Finch
