= Olive Wheeler =

British academic

Dame Olive Wheeler DBE
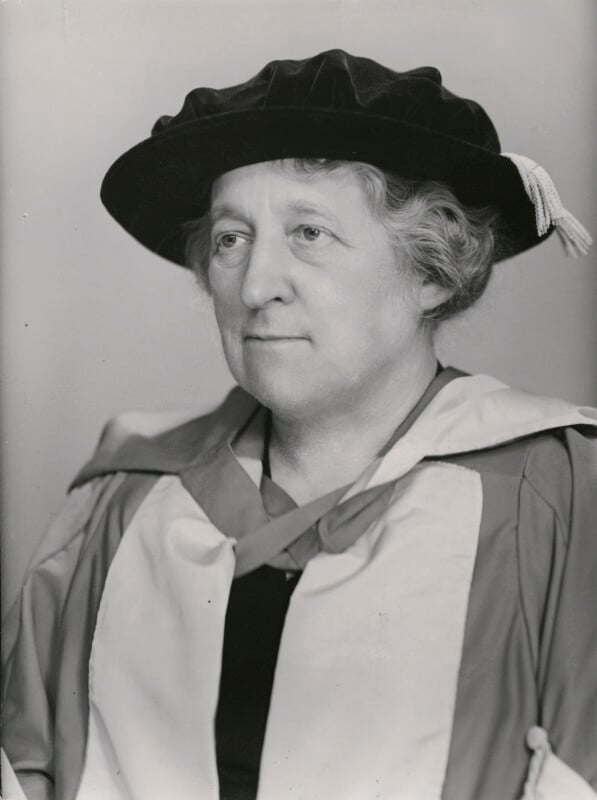
- Wheeler in 1950
- Born: May 4, 1886; Brecon
- Died: September 26, 1963 (aged 77); Cardiff

Academic background
- Education: University College of Wales, Aberystwyth; Bedford College, London
- Thesis: Anthropomorphism and science : a study of the development of ejective cognition in the individual and the race (DSc) (1916)

Academic work
- Discipline: Educational Psychology
- Institutions: University College of South Wales and Monmouthshire

Dame Olive Annie Wheeler, DBE (4 May 1886 – 26 September 1963) was a Welsh educationist and psychologist, and Professor of Education at University College of South Wales and Monmouthshire, now Cardiff University.

== Early life ==
Born at the High Street in Brecon, Olive Wheeler was the younger daughter of Annie Wheeler, née Poole, and her husband, Henry Burford Wheeler. Henry Wheeler was a master printer and publisher. She attended Brecon County School for Girls. She received an Honours Central Welsh Board Certificate in 1904. She attended University College of Wales, Aberystwyth and graduated with a BSc in Chemistry in 1907, and a MSc in 1911. At Aberystwyth she was elected president of the Students' Representative Council. In 1908 she was awarded a double first in a Secondary Teachers Certificate, University of Wales.

Wheeler completed a DSc (Doctor of Science) in Psychology at Bedford College, London (now part of Royal Holloway, University of London) in 1916. She enrolled for the DSc in the Michaelmas term of 1911 at the age of twenty five. Her mother, Annie Wheeler, was a signatory on the form (her father was already dead), along with A. H. Lewis, a Baptist Minister in Brecon, and Uma Wright, Secretary to Brecon Gas Company.

== Career ==
Her first teaching appointment was as lecturer in mental and moral science at Cheltenham Ladies College. She was later appointed to a lectureship in education at the University of Manchester, and served as Dean of the Faculty of Education. In 1921 she applied for the Chair in Education at Swansea University College. Wheeler stood as the Labour candidate for the University of Wales parliamentary constituency in the 1922 general election against Thomas Arthur Lewis. She was President of the Aberystwyth Old Students' Association in 1923–24.

Wheeler was appointed as Professor of Education (Women) at University College at Cardiff in 1925, as well as (temporarily) the Dean of the Faculty of Education. She was the first female head of department in the University of Wales. Her title was officially changed to Professor of Education in 1933. In 1947 she became chairperson of the Welsh Advisory Council on Youth Employment and chairman of the South Wales District of the Workers Education Association.

Wheeler was a fellow of the British Psychological Society. Three years after her retirement in 1951 she went to Canada on a lecture tour.

== Damehood ==
She was created a Dame Commander of the Order of the British Empire in the 1950 New Year Honours for education and social work in Wales, particularly for her work with the University of Wales, the Workers’ Educational Association and the Welsh Joint Education Committee.

== Death ==
She died suddenly in the Kardomah Café in Queen Street, Cardiff on 26 September 1963. In her will she left £27,434. She bequeathed her library of educational materials to Cardiff University, as well as funds to create an annual prize of £500 (equivalent to £9,000 in 2025) to be awarded to the university's top student in the department of education. She left £250 to the South Wales District of the Workers' Educational Association and Park End Presbyterian Church, Cardiff.

== Affiliations ==
- Fellow, University of Wales

== Bibliography ==
- ——; William Phillips; Joseph P. Spillane (1961). Mental Health and Education. London: University of London Press.
- Wheeler, Olive A. (June 1943). "The Service of Youth". British Journal of Educational Psychology. 13 (2): 69–73. doi:10.1111/j.2044-8279.1943.tb02723.x. S2CID 145128369.
- Youth: The Psychology of Adolescence and its Bearing on the Reorganization of Adolescent Education. London: London University Press. 1933; second edition, 1937.
- Creative Education and the Future. London: University of London Press. 1936.

Professional and academic associations
Preceded by Henry Howard Humphreys	President of the Aberystwyth Old Students' Association; 1923–24	Succeeded by Jenkin James
