= Thomas Iorwerth Ellis =

Welsh academic

Thomas Iorwerth Ellis OBE (19 December 1899 – 20 April 1970) was a Welsh classicist, who wrote many books on Welsh literature and Welshmen (in Welsh and English), including a biography of his father, Thomas Edward Ellis.

== Early life ==
Ellis, the son of the MP Thomas Edward Ellis, who had died seven months before his birth, and his wife Annie Jane (née Davies) was educated at Westminster School (where he was a King's Scholar), the University College of Wales, Aberystwyth and Jesus College, Oxford.

== Career ==
He was an assistant master at Cardiff School for Boys from 1924 to 1928, then an assistant lecturer in classics at University College, Swansea from 1928 to 1930. He left to become headmaster of the County School in Rhyl, a post he held for 10 years. He was a lecturer in classics at St David's College, Lampeter from 1940 to 1941, then a lecturer at Aberystwyth from 1941 to 1946. He helped to found the New Wales Union in 1941 and was secretary for 25 years. He was awarded an honorary degree of LLD by the University of Wales in 1967 in recognition of his services to the culture of Wales, and in the following year he was appointed an Officer of the Order of the British Empire. He was President of the Aberystwyth Old Students' Association in 1942–43. He served as warden of the Guild of Graduates of the University of Wales for six years, and as High Sheriff of Cardiganshire from 1944 to 1945. He was also a member of the Court and Council of the University College of Wales, Aberystwyth and of the National Library of Wales, and served as a member of the Governing Body, Representative Body and College of Episcopal Electors of the Church in Wales. He died on 20 April 1970.

== Personal life ==
He was married to Mari Ellis (born Mary Headley), the writer and women's rights activist. They had a son, Rolant, and a daughter, Marged, who, under the name Meg Elis, is a writer and activist.

== Publications ==
- The Development of Higher Education in Wales (1935)
- Life of Thomas Edward Ellis Vol. I (1944) and Vol. II (1948) – his father
- Crwydro Ceredigion (1952);
- T. C. Edwards letters (ed.) (1952, 1953)
- Crwydro Meirionnydd (1954)
- Ym Mêr Fy Esgyrn (1955)
- Crwydro Maldwyn (1957)
- Crwydro Mynwy (1958)
- Crwydro Sir y Fflint (1959)
- Life of J. H. Davies (1963) – his uncle
- Dilyn Llwybrau (1967)
- Life of Ellis Jones Griffith (1969)
- Crwydro Llundain (1971, reprinted 1977)

Ellis also made a number of contributions to the Dictionary of Welsh Biography (published by the Honourable Society of Cymmrodorion) and articles and reviews in various English- and Welsh-language journals.

Professional and academic associations
Preceded by Myfanwy Ellis	President of the Aberystwyth Old Students' Association; 1942–43	Succeeded by Prof. Thomas James Jenkin
