= E. John Russell =

British agricultural scientist (1872–1965)

Sir E. John Russell OBE FRS
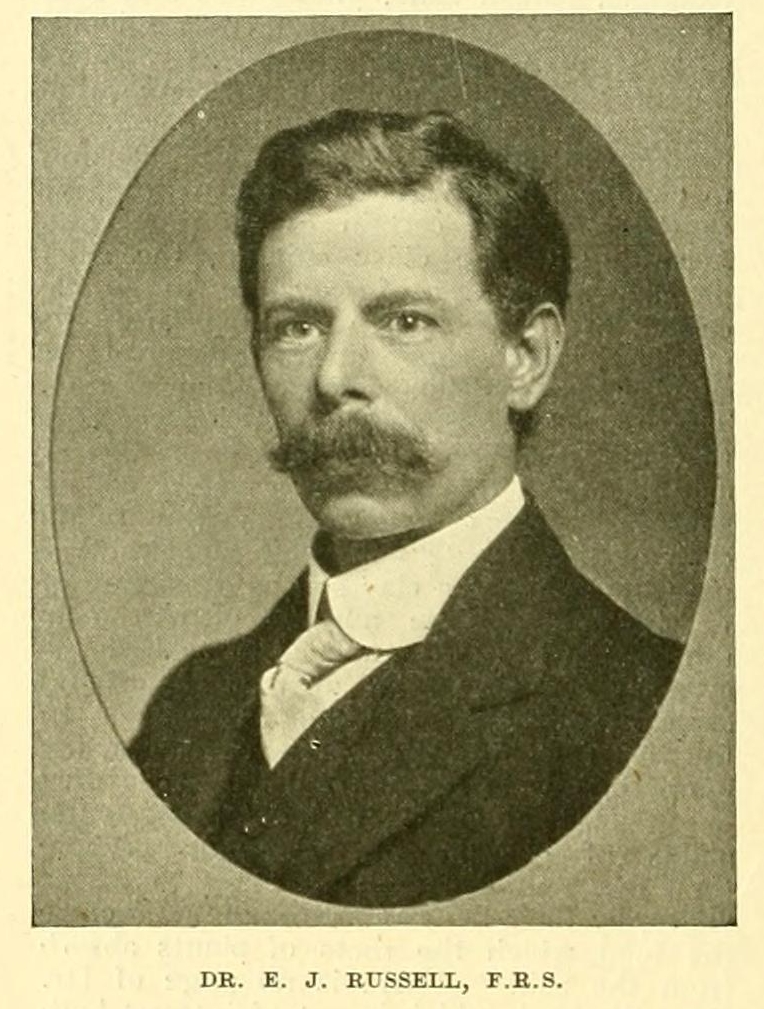
- Born: 31 October 1872; Frampton on Severn, Gloucestershire, England
- Died: 12 July 1965 (aged 92); Goring-on-Thames, England
- Education: Aberystwyth University; Victoria University of Manchester; University of London
- Scientific career
- Fields: Chemistry

Sir Edward John Russell OBE FRS (31 October 1872 – 12 July 1965) was a British soil chemist, agriculture scientist, and director of Rothamsted Experimental Station from 1912 to 1943. He was responsible for hiring R. A. Fisher for statistical research at Rothamsted and driven by concerns over a lack of international information exchange about agriculture, he initiated the Imperial Agricultural Bureaux, which later became the Commonwealth Agricultural Bureaux.

== Biography ==
Russell was born at Frampton-on-Severn, Gloucestershire, the eldest son of the Reverend Edward T. Russell who had worked earlier as a schoolmaster. In 1885 he studied at Birmingham where the family moved before relocating the next year to London. He was educated at Carmarthen Presbyterian College; University College of Wales, Aberystwyth; the Victoria University of Manchester, and in 1902 earned his Doctor of Science in chemistry from the University of London.

Russell worked as a demonstrator and lecturer at the chemistry department in Victoria University, Manchester from 1898 and became head of chemistry at the South Eastern Agricultural College from 1892 to 1907. From 1907 to 1912 he was a soil chemist at Rothamsted supported by a Goldsmith's Company's endowment of £10,000. In 1913 he became director of the research station, succeeding Alfred Daniel Hall. Russell worked on soil chemistry and plant nutrition appointing R. A. Fisher in 1919. In the 1918 New Year Honours Russell was awarded an OBE for his wartime work as Technical Adviser in the Government's Food Production Department. He was knighted in 1922. Russell was President of the Geographical Association in 1923 and President of the Aberystwyth Old Students' Association from 1928 to 1929. In 1920 he wrote the obituary of chemist Percival Spencer Umfreville Pickering.

Russell was president of the British Association for 1948–1949. He married Elnor Oldham of Manchester in 1903 and they had six children of whom one son, Walter, became a soil physicist at Rothamsted. He is buried, with his wife, in the churchyard of St Nicholas in Harpenden.

== Books ==
- Russell, E J (1921). Soil Conditions and Plant Growth. Monographs on Biochemistry. London: Longmans, Green – via Internet Archive.
- Russell, E J (1912). Lessons on Soil. The Cambridge Nature Study Series. London: Cambridge University Press – via Internet Archive.
- Russell, E J (1913). The Fertility of the Soil. The Cambridge Manuals of Science and Literature. London: Cambridge University Press – via Internet Archive.
- Russell, E J (1921). A Student's Book on Soils and Manures. The Cambridge Farm Institute Series. London: Cambridge University Press – via Internet Archive.
- Russell, E J, ed. (1923). The Micro-organisms of the Soil. The Rothamsted Monographs on Agricultural Science. London: Longmans, Green – via Internet Archive.
- Russell, E J (1916). Manuring for Higher Crop Production. Cambridge: Cambridge University Press – via Internet Archive.

Professional and academic associations
Preceded by E. W. Dobbs	President of the Aberystwyth Old Students' Association; 1928–29	Succeeded by Sir C. Bryner Jones
