= T. J. Jenkin =

Welsh botanist (1885–1965)

Thomas James Jenkin
- Born: 1885; Maenclochog, Pembrokeshire, Wales.
- Died: 1965 (aged 79–80)
- Citizenship: British
- Occupation: Grassland scientist
- Known for: Scientist
- Title: Professor

Thomas James Jenkin (1885–1965) was professor of agriculture at University College of Wales, Aberystwyth and director of the Welsh Plant Breeding Station from 1942 to 1950.

== Biography ==
Thomas James Jenkin was born in 1885 in Maenclochog, Pembrokeshire, Wales. He was Agricultural Officer for Brecon and Radnorshire from 1914 to 1915 and advisor in agricultural botany at the University College of North Wales, Bangor from 1915 to 1920. In 1919 he was appointed by Sir George Stapledon as grass breeder at the newly formed Welsh Plant Breeding Station in Aberystwyth. He was an early pioneer of grass breeding and genetics and made some of the earliest advances in hybridisation of grass species. He succeeded Stapledon as director of the WPBS in 1942, on the recommendation of J. B. S. Haldane. He was President of the Aberystwyth Old Students' Association in 1943–44. He retired as director in 1950 and died in 1965.

Professional and academic associations
Preceded by Dr Thomas Iorwerth Ellis	President of the Aberystwyth Old Students' Association; 1943–44	Succeeded by I. C. Jones
