= Thomas Jones of Denbigh =

Welsh Methodist clergyman and writer

Thomas Jones (1756 – 16 June 1820), called "Thomas Jones of Denbigh" (in Welsh, "Thomas Jones o Ddinbych") to differentiate him from namesakes, was a Welsh Methodist clergyman, writer, editor and poet, active in North Wales.

== Life history ==
Thomas Jones was born in 1756 at Aberwheeler in Denbighshire, but was educated at Caerwys and Holywell in Flintshire.

In 1783 he became a Methodist preacher. At around the same time, he became acquainted with Thomas Charles of Bala, who influenced him greatly. Jones worked with Charles to devise the "Rules and Design of the … Welsh Methodists" (1801) and both edited the Welsh-language periodical, Y Drysorfa' while the publication was still in its quarterly form.

In 1795 he married Elizabeth Jones, but she died two years later. Inheriting her fortune, he remarried in 1804. His second wife also died, and he married a third time in 1806, to a Mary Lloyd.

In 1811 he was ordained a Calvinistic Methodist minister. He wrote many hymns, and was highly active within his denomination.

Jones was married three times, first to Elizabeth Jones, of Mold, in 1795; Elizabeth died in 1797. He married Ann Maysmor of Llanelidan in 1804, and following her death married Mary Lloyd of Llanrwst, in 1806. He died on 16 June 1820.

== Works ==
Thomas Jones made significant contribution in content and style to Welsh theology. He was a strong opponent of Arminianism, which was prominent among the Wesleyans, and translated The Christian in Complete Amor (1655–1662) by William Gurnall into Welsh under the title The Cristian in Full Armor (1796–1820). His masterpiece is the huge volume he published in 1813 on the history of Protestant Martyrs Theologians, Martyrs, and confessors of the Church of England (or History of the Martyrs).

With Thomas Charles of Bala he was editor of the Spiritual Treasure, which first came out in 1799 as a quarterly publication. He also wrote a number of hymns, including "I Know my Buyer is alive" and "Oh! Lead my soul into the waters".

Jones wrote an autobiography (1814) and a memoir of his friend Thomas Charles. He published a fairly standard English and Welsh dictionary in 1800. He was also a poet; "To the Birds Thrush" (1773) is the best example of his poems.

Jones printed a substantial part of his work on a press which he set up at his home in Ruthin in 1804. He sold the press to Thomas Gee the elder, father of the famous printer Thomas Gee, in 1813.

== Works ==
- English and Welsh Dictionary (1800)

== Bibliography ==
- Davies, John; Jenkins, Nigel (2008). The Welsh Academy Encyclopaedia of Wales. Cardiff: University of Wales Press. ISBN 978-0-7083-1953-6.
