= Emrys Jones (geographer) =

Welsh geographer (1920–2006)

Professor Emrys Jones
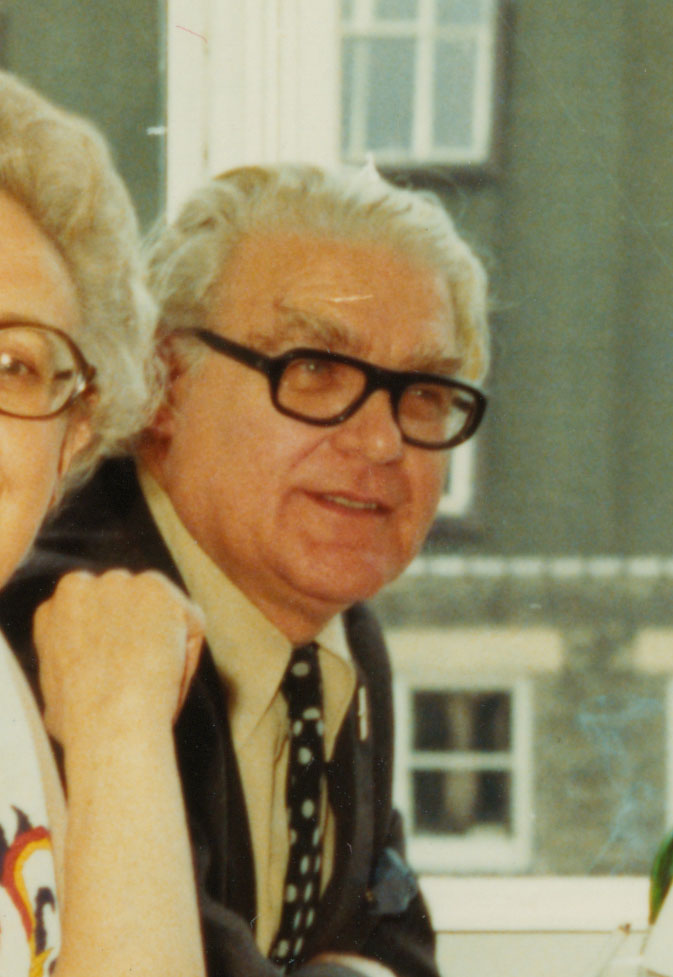
- Born: 17 August 1920; Aberdare, Wales
- Died: 30 August 2006 (aged 86)
- Education: Aberystwyth University
- Scientific career
- Fields: Geography
- Workplaces: University College London; Queen's University, Belfast; London School of Economics

Emrys Jones, FBA, FRGS (17 August 1920 – 30 August 2006) was a Welsh Professor of Geography at the London School of Economics and an author and consultant in the fields of geography and urban planning. He was a Member of the Aberystwyth Old Students' Association and served as President (1984–85).

Professional and academic associations
Preceded by Dilys Wynne Lloyd	President of the Aberystwyth Old Students' Association; 1984–1985	Succeeded by Thomas Ceiri Gruffydd
