= Annie Jane Hughes Griffiths =

Welsh woman peace campaigner

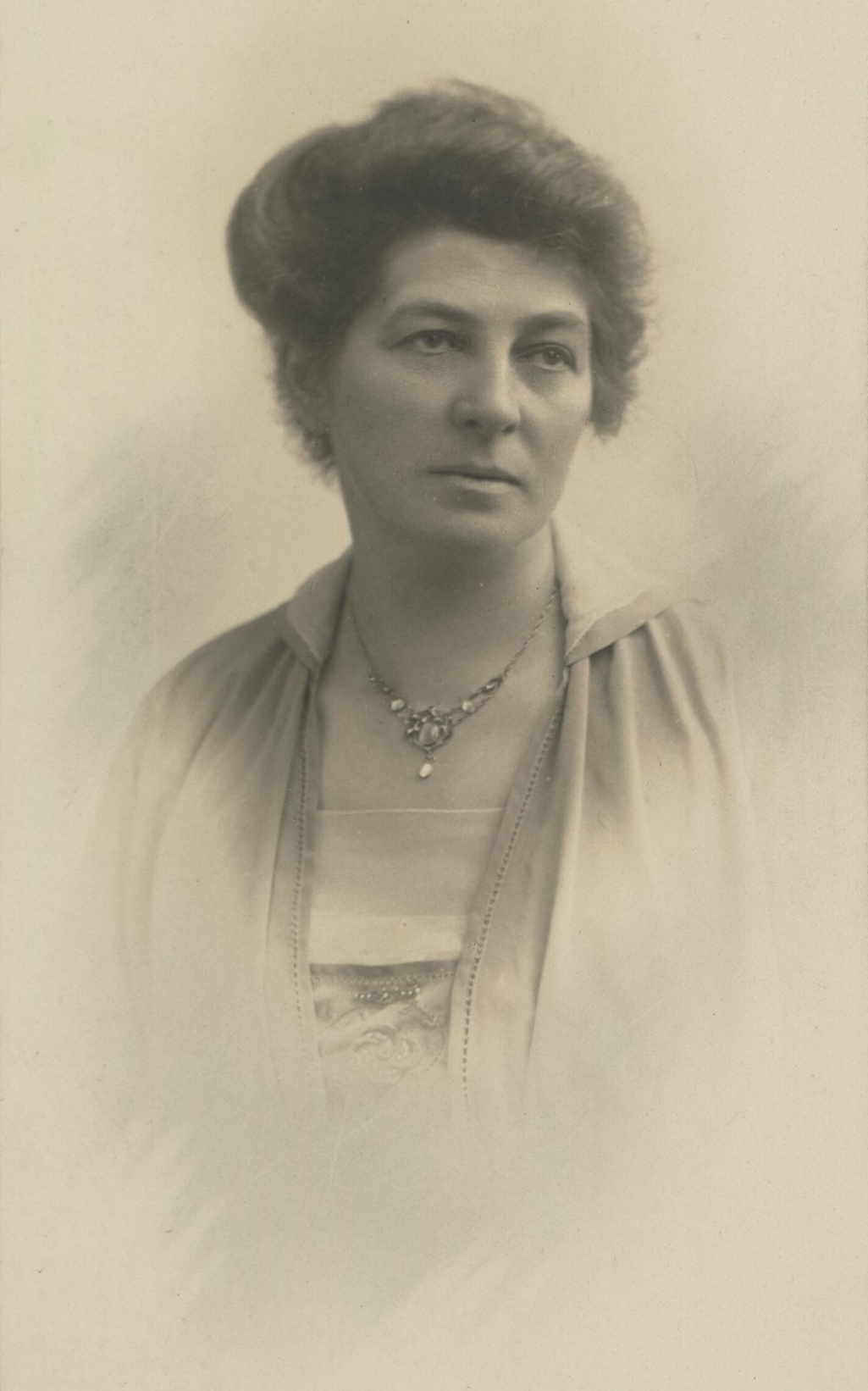
- Annie Jane Hughes Griffiths around 1920
- Born: Annie Jane Davies; April 5, 1873; Llangeitho
- Died: October 7, 1942 (aged 69); Aberystwyth
- Other names: Annie Jane Ellis; Annie Jane Davies; Annie Jane Hughes-Griffiths; Mrs Peter Hughes-Griffiths; Annie Cwrt Mawr
- Known for: Peace campaigner

Annie Jane Hughes Griffiths (April 5, 1873 – October 7, 1942) was a Welsh peace activist.

== Early life ==
Hughes Griffiths was one of the ten children of Frances (née Humphreys) and Robert Joseph Davies, born in 1873. Members of the family, including her parents and several siblings, were well-connected and leading figures in both local political and religious life. They lived in Cwrt Mawr, a large Georgian mansion near Llangeitho village in Wales. She was sent to schools in Aberystwyth, London and Chester.

She was at the University College of Wales in Aberystwyth for three years but did not undertake degree studies.

== Activist and peace campaigner ==
She became a public figure due to association with the University College of Wales and the campaign for a Welsh National Library. She also worked to help young Welsh women in London as part of her membership of the Welsh Chapel in Charing Cross, London.

Sje was active in the League of Nations and became the first president of the Welsh League of Nations Union in 1923. She also acted as treasurer for the WLNU's Welsh Women's Peace Petition to the women of the United States in to encourage their country to join the League and thereby promote world peace following the World War I. After 390,296 signatures had been collected, Hughes Griffiths led the group that took it to America, arriving in February 1924. It was presented at formal event in a New York hotel, and Hughes Griffiths subsequently toured the United States, delivering several further speeches. She met the president, Calvin Coolidge, at an informal event in the White House.

Although the US did not join the League of Nations, she continued her activity and support for peace and humanitarian causes. The petition was returned to Wales and is now in the National Library of Wales in Aberystwyth. Her diary of the visit to America, press cuttings, some correspondence and other papers are in the National Library in Aberystwyth.

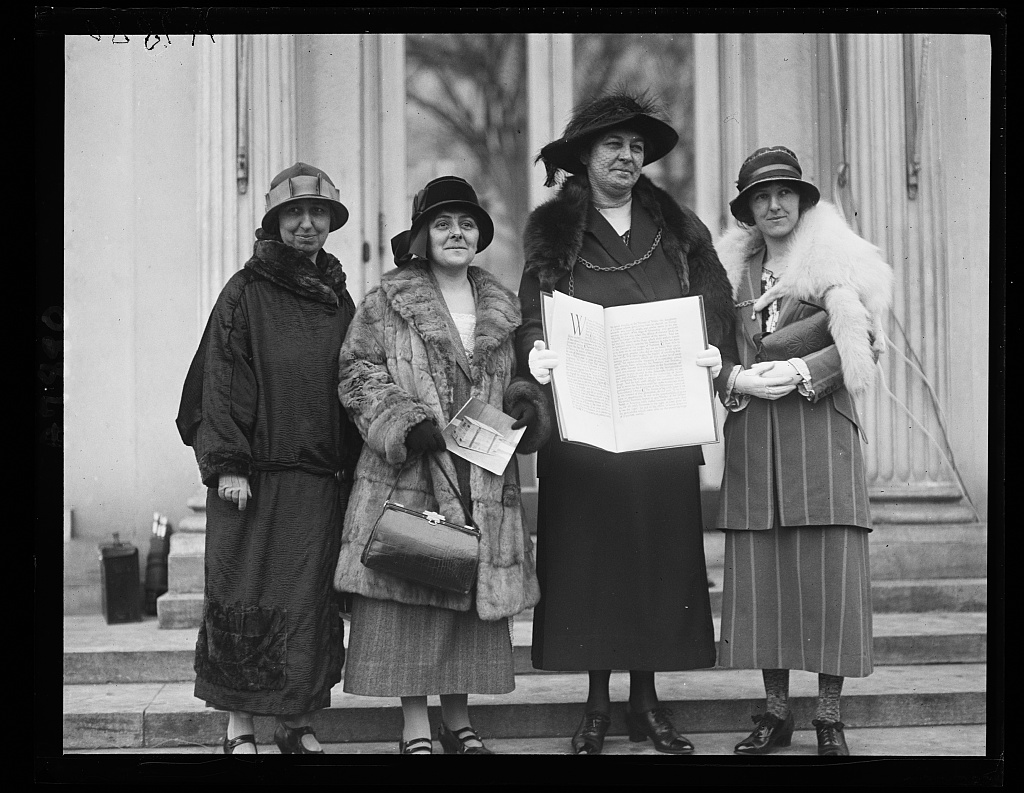
Annie Jane Hughes Griffiths, Chair of the Welsh League of Nations, holding the Welsh Women's Peace Petition outside the White House in Washington D.C., 1924, with Mrs Ruth Morgan, Miss Eluned Prys (social worker) and Miss Mary Elizabeth Ellis (one of His Majesty's Inspectors of Schools)

== Honors ==
In November 2023 a Purple Plaque was installed in Aberystwyth to mark her work for peace and as a political campaigner.

A play about her life and work by the theatre company In Character (Mewn Cymeriad) toured Wales in 2023 and 2024.

== Personal life ==
While she was in London from 1895, housekeeping for two of her brothers, she met Thomas (Tom) Edward Ellis, the Liberal MP for Merionethshire. They married in June 1898. His health declined, and they went to Cannes in France for him to recover. However, he died in April 1899. She gave birth to their child, Thomas Iorweth in December 1899. In 1916, she married Reverend Peter Hughes Griffiths, the minister at the Welsh Chapel in Charing Cross, London.

She spent most of her life in either Aberystwyth or London. Griffiths was also involved in Welsh culture. She joined the Welsh Folk-Song Society (Cymdeithas Alawon Gwerin Cymru) in 1908, soon after it was founded. She played the harp and sponsored prizes for folksongs at a student's eisteddfod in Aberystwyth in 1911.

Annie Jane Hughes Griffiths died at Neuadd Wen, Llanbadarn Road, Aberystwyth on 7 October 1942. She was buried at Gwynfil Chapel in Llangeitho.
