= William Mars-Jones =

Welsh barrister and judge (1915–1999)

Sir William Mars-Jones MBE

Justice of the High Court
- In office 4 March 1969 – 4 September 1990

Personal details
- Born: William Lloyd Mars-Jones; 4 September 1915 Llansannan, Denbighshire, Wales
- Died: 10 January 1999 (aged 83) London
- Children: 3, including Adam Mars-Jones
- Education: University College Wales, Aberystwyth; St John's College, Cambridge

Sir William Lloyd Mars-Jones, MBE (4 September 1915 – 10 January 1999) was a Welsh barrister and High Court judge. He presided over several high-profile criminal trials.

== Early life and war service ==
Mars-Jones was born in Llansannan, Denbighshire, the son of Henry Mars Jones, sometime chairman of the Denbighshire County Council, and Helen Mars Jones. His brother, David Mars-Jones, was Mayor of Colwyn in 1976 and High Sheriff of Clwyd in 1989. Mars-Jones was educated at Denbigh County School and University College Wales, Aberystwyth, where he took a First in Law and president of the Union. He then took a second degree at St John's College, Cambridge, where he was a member of the Footlights.

He joined Gray's Inn, but the Second World War broke out before he could be called to the bar. He served in the Royal Naval Volunteer Reserve, reaching the rank of lieutenant commander, and was appointed a Member of the Order of the British Empire (Military Division) in 1945. He contested Denbigh as a Labour candidate in the 1945 election.

== Legal career ==
After the war, Mars-Jones joined the Wales and Chester circuit and practiced from the former chambers of Lord Justice Arthian Davies at 1 Farrar's Building. He was appointed Queen's Counsel in 1957. In 1966, he assisted Attorney-General Sir Frederick Elwyn Jones in the prosecution of Ian Brady and Myra Hindley, the Moors murderers.

== Judicial career ==
Mars-Jones was appointed to the High Court in 1969 and assigned to the Queen's Bench Division, receiving the customary knighthood. He presided over a number of high-profile criminal trials. In 1976, he tried serial killer Donald Neilson, at Oxford Crown Court and sentenced him to life imprisonment. In 1977, he tried several members of the Metropolitan Police's obscene publications squad for corruption. In 1978, he tried actor John Bindon for murder (his sympathetic summing-up was thought to have swayed the jury, which acquitted Bindon). He presided over the corruption trial of three men in Liverpool Crown Court over the building of Kirkby Ski Slope in spring 1978.

The same year, he presided over the ABC trial: he described it as an "oppressive prosecution", which led to all charges under section 1 of the Official Secrets Act being dropped by the Attorney-General. In 1986, he sentenced Nezar Hindawi, who had tried to blow up an El Al aircraft, to 45 years imprisonment, believed to be the longest determinate criminal sentence in British history. He retired in 1990, upon reaching the age of 75.

Mars-Jones served as president of the University College of North Wales between 1982 and 1995. Between 1988 and 1994, he was president of the London Welsh Trust. He was a Member of the Aberystwyth Old Students' Association and served as President (1987–88).

== Personal life ==
He married Sheila Mary Felicity Cobon in 1947; they had three sons. The novelist and literary critic Adam Mars-Jones is his son; he published Kid Gloves: A Voyage Round My Father, a memoir about his complex relationship with his father, in 2015.

== Arms ==
Coat of arms of William Mars-Jones
Notes Displayed in a painting at Gray's Inn. Crest A dragon's head Gules and a griffin's head Or counter combatant gorged with bars gemelles dancety counterchanged. Escutcheon Sable a stag trippant Argent on a chief Azure three swords erect Argent pommels and hilts Or. Motto Gorau Tartan Cyflawnder

Professional and academic associations
Preceded by Eric Sunderland	President of the Aberystwyth Old Students' Association; 1987–88	Succeeded by Ifan Gruffydd Moelwyn Hughes
