= Holme Moss transmitting station =

Radio and TV transmitter in Yorkshire, England

Holme Moss
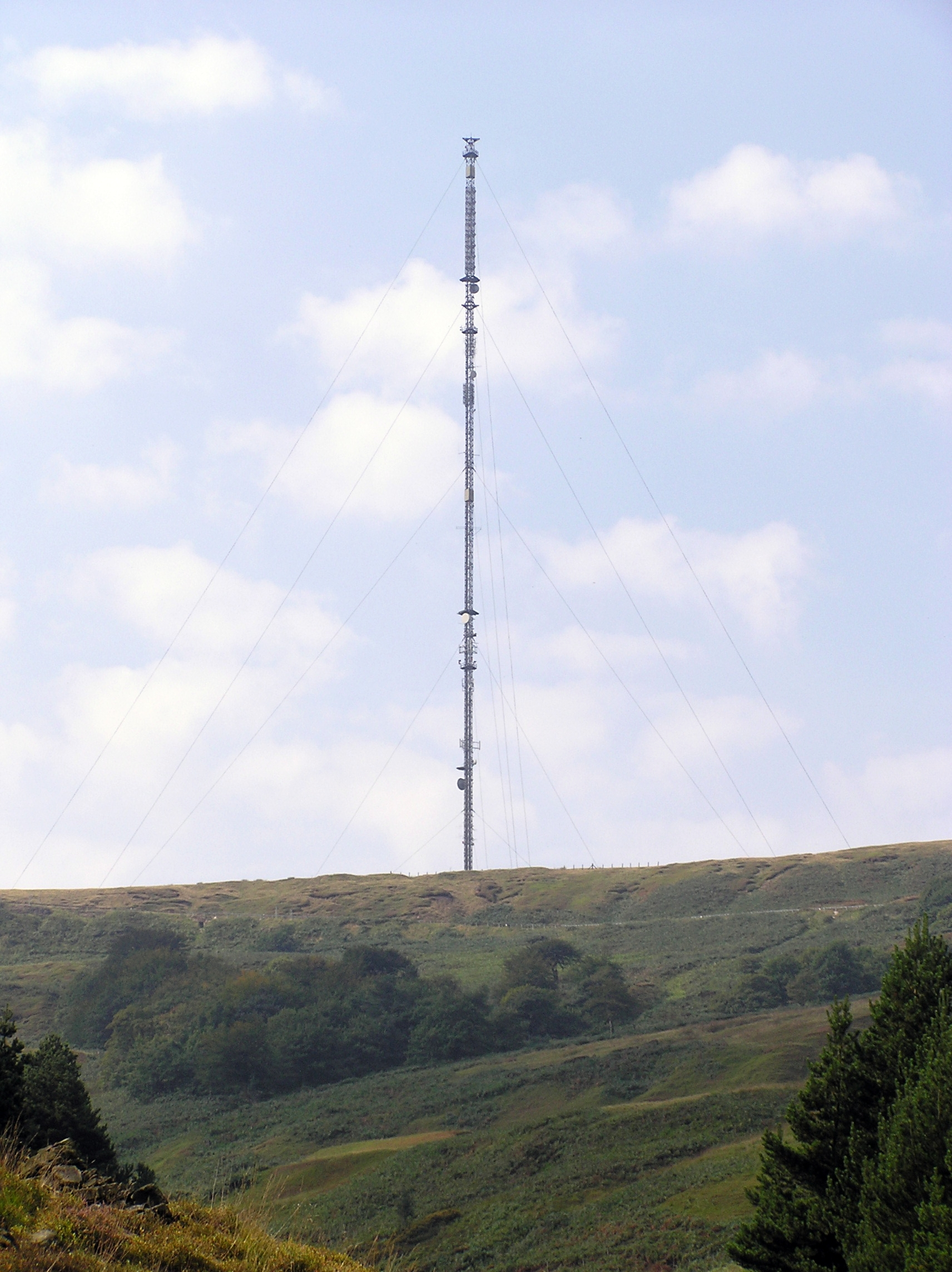
- Holme Moss radio mast

- Location within West Yorkshire
- Location: Holme Valley, Kirklees, West Yorkshire
- Mast height: 228 metres (748 ft)
- Coordinates: 53.533221°N 1.858187°W
- Grid reference: SE095040
- Built: 1951
- BBC region: BBC North (1951-1985)

The Holme Moss transmitting station is a radio transmitting station at Holme Moss in West Yorkshire, England. The mast provides VHF coverage of both FM and DAB to a wide area around the mast including Derbyshire, Greater Manchester, South Yorkshire and West Yorkshire.

== History ==
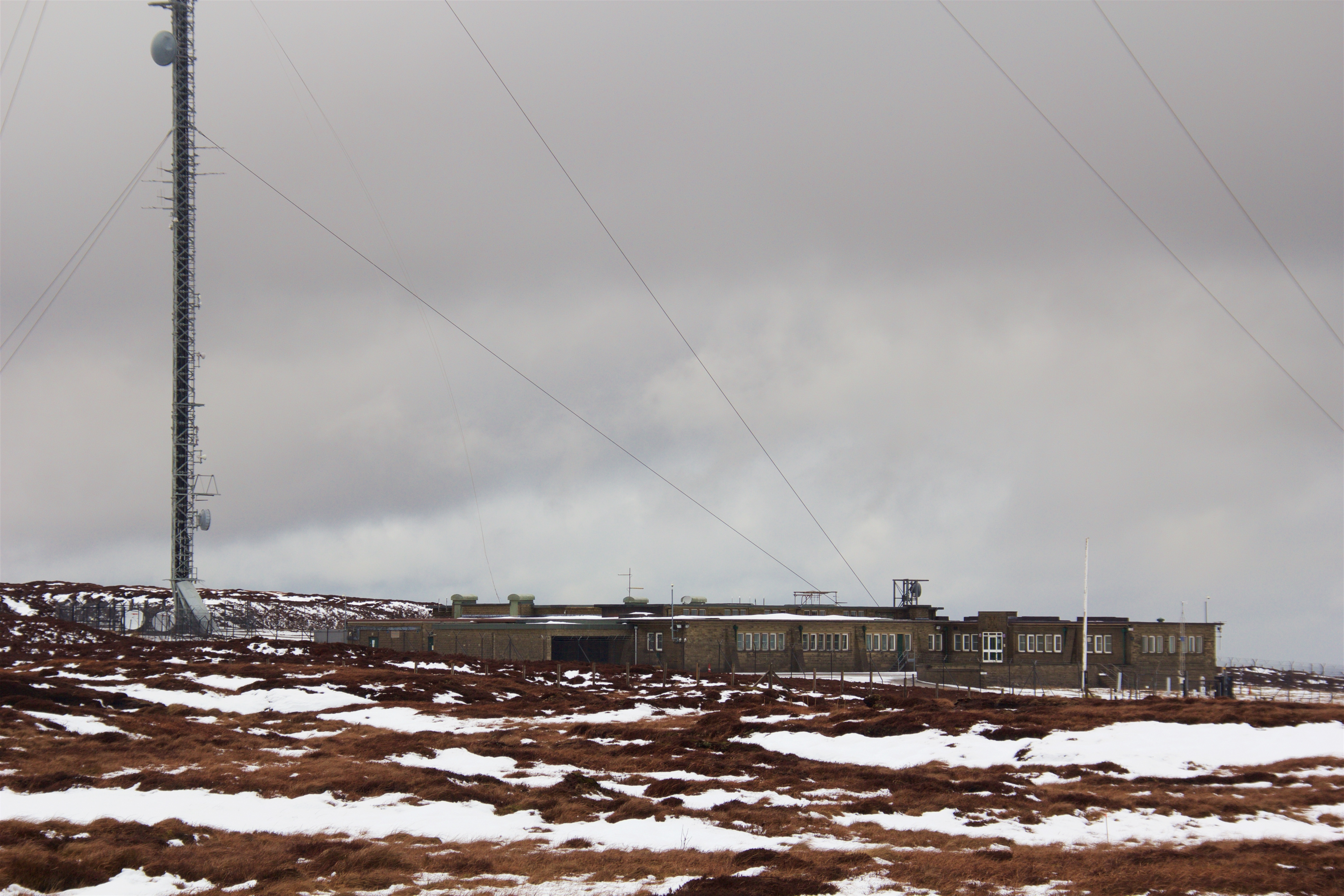
Buildings at the base of the antenna

Holme Moss transmitting station was built by British Insulated Callender's Cables with John Laing & Son acting as sub-contractors for the foundations. It became the BBC's third public television transmitter, launched on 12 October 1951. Of historic and technical interest, this operated on the 405 line VHF system, with black and white transmissions originally on British System A, Channel 2, with vision 51.75 MHz, 45 kW and sound 48.25 MHz, 12 kW. The mast survived until the end of the Band I TV broadcasts in 1985, with a replacement mast being constructed, adjacent, in 1984. In early 1986, there was concern that heavy blocks of ice could bring down the old mast: February 1986 had been one of the coldest months on record, but demolition contractors worried that a sudden burst of warm weather could loosen lumps of ice, with the shock of the fall possibly buckling the old mast at its badly rusted centre. This in turn threatened to damage the new mast just 100 yards away and put all its FM broadcasts off air. In the event, a gradual thaw alleviated the problem, and the old mast was taken apart as planned.

The site is now owned and operated by Arqiva.

VHF Radio broadcasts started on 10 December 1956, for the Home, Light, Third Programme as they were then titled (see table). To this day, these three stations operate on exactly the same frequencies as they did in 1956. Subsequently, BBC Local Radio services were added in the early 1970s. With the awarding of a national commercial station, Classic FM is also broadcast. DAB transmissions also now originate from here.

These transmissions cover North West England (mainly Greater Manchester and Cheshire) and most of Yorkshire; however, signals can be heard as far south as London and as far north as Scotland, whilst coverage can also be heard in Ireland and mainland Europe.

The base of the station is 1,719 ft (524 m) above sea level and the mast another 750 ft (228 m) on top of that. This gives a maximum aerial height of 2,467 ft (752 m) which is one of the highest in the UK. The mast weighs 140 tons and is held up by 5 sets of stay levels. At 250 kW ERP on the national channels, it is one of the most powerful VHF sites in the country.

== Services available ==
=== Analogue radio (FM VHF) ===
Frequency	kW	Service	Entered service	Notes
89.3 MHz	250	BBC Radio 2	10 December 1956	Originally the Light Programme
91.5 MHz	250	BBC Radio 3	10 December 1956	Originally the Third Programme
92.4 MHz	5.6	BBC Radio Leeds	1975	Radiating northwards towards West Yorkshire
93.7 MHz	250	BBC Radio 4	10 December 1956	Originally the North Regional Home Service
95.1 MHz	5.6	BBC Radio Manchester	10 September 1970	Radiating westwards towards Manchester, north-east Cheshire and parts of the High Peak in Derbyshire
98.9 MHz	250	BBC Radio 1	1 September 1988	At launch, the output was 60 kW. This was increased to 250 kW on 19 December 1989.
101.1 MHz	250	Classic FM	7 September 1992	
104.1 MHz	4.4	BBC Radio Sheffield	1975	Radiating south and eastwards towards South Yorkshire and Bassetlaw in northern Nottinghamshire

=== Digital radio (DAB) ===
Frequency	Block	kW	Operator
222.064 MHz	11D	4.7	Digital One
225.648 MHz	12B	5	BBC National DAB

=== Analogue television ===
TV transmissions ceased from this site with the demise of the original VHF service in 1985.

Frequency	VHF	kW	Service
51.75 MHz	2	100	BBC1 North

== Relay services ==
Being the main radio site in the North West and Yorkshire region, there are also a number of smaller relay transmitters used to fill in areas which receive poor coverage from Holme Moss. This is particularly evident around the Pennines, where there are many hills which result in poor reception from Holme Moss (especially indoors).

=== Analogue radio ===
Transmitter	kW	BBC R1	BBC R2	BBC R3	BBC R4	Classic FM	BBC Local	Notes
Barnoldswick	0.02	99.3 MHz	89.7 MHz	91.9 MHz	94.1 MHz	—N/a	—N/a	Serves area of Barnoldswick
Beecroft Hill	0.2	99.4 MHz	89.8 MHz	92.0 MHz	94.2 MHz	101.6 MHz	103.9 MHz	Relays BBC Radio Leeds. Serves western areas of Leeds
Buxton	0.1	99.6 MHz	90.0 MHz	92.2 MHz	94.4 MHz		96.0 MHz	Relays BBC Radio Derby. Serves the Buxton area
Chesterfield	0.4	98.6 MHz	89.0 MHz	91.2 MHz	93.4 MHz		94.7 MHz	Relays BBC Radio Sheffield. BBC national FM services are relayed from Sutton Coldfield
Cornholme	0.02	99.3 MHz	89.7 MHz	91.9 MHz	94.1 MHz	—N/a	—N/a	Serves villages of Cornholme and Lydgate, west of Todmorden.
Haslingden	0.083	99.5 MHz	89.9 MHz	92.1 MHz	94.3 MHz	—N/a	—N/a	Serves Haslingden area.
Hebden Bridge	0.025	98.0 MHz	88.4 MHz	90.6 MHz	92.8 MHz	—N/a	—N/a	Serves Hebden Bridge area.
Idle	0.025	98.1 MHz	88.5 MHz	90.7 MHz	92.9 MHz	100.3 MHz	—N/a	Serves Bradford area.
Keighley	1	98.5 MHz	88.9 MHz	91.1 MHz	93.3 MHz	—N/a	102.7 MHz	Relays BBC Radio Leeds. Serves Keighley area.
Kendal	0.1	98.6 MHz	89.0 MHz	91.2 MHz	93.4 MHz	—N/a	—N/a	Serves Kendal area.
Luddenden	0.084	98.3 MHz	88.7 MHz	90.9 MHz	93.1 MHz	—N/a	95.3 MHz	Relays BBC Radio Leeds. Serves areas west of Halifax and the Ryburn Valley.
Morecambe Bay	10	99.6 MHz	90.0 MHz	92.2 MHz	94.4 MHz	101.8 MHz	—N/a	Serves large areas of Southern Cumbria.
Olivers Mount	0.25	99.5 MHz	89.9 MHz	92.1 MHz	94.3 MHz	—N/a	—N/a	Serves Scarborough and surrounding areas.
Pendle Forest	0.1	97.8 MHz	90.2 MHz	92.6 MHz	94.6 MHz	—N/a	—N/a	Serves Burnley and Colne areas.
Saddleworth	0.095	99.3 MHz	89.8 MHz	91.9 MHz	94.1 MHz	—N/a	104.6 MHz	Relays BBC Radio Manchester. Serves Saddleworth and Tameside in the Upper Tame Valley
Sheffield	0.32	99.5 MHz	89.9 MHz	92.1 MHz	94.3 MHz	101.7 MHz	88.6 MHz	Relays BBC Radio Sheffield. Serves parts of Sheffield
Stanton Moor	1.2	99.4 MHz	89.8 MHz	92.0 MHz	94.2 MHz	—N/a	—N/a	Serves areas of the southern Peak District including Matlock, Bakewell and Cromford areas.
Todmorden	0.1	98.5 MHz	88.9 MHz	91.1 MHz	93.3 MHz	—N/a	—N/a	Serves Todmorden area (relayed via Cornholme).
Walsden South	0.01	98.0 MHz	88.4 MHz	90.6 MHz	92.8 MHz	—N/a	—N/a	Serves Walsden area and Littleborough, just south of Todmorden.
Wensleydale	0.054	97.9 MHz	88.3 MHz	90.5 MHz	92.7 MHz	—N/a	—N/a	Serves Wensleydale area.
Whalley	0.01	99.2 MHz	89.6 MHz	91.8 MHz	94.0 MHz	—N/a	—N/a	Serves Whalley and Clitheroe areas.
Wharfedale	0.04	98.0 MHz	88.4 MHz	90.6 MHz	92.8 MHz	—N/a	95.3 MHz	Relays BBC Radio Leeds. Serves Wharfedale north of Leeds
Windermere	0.064	97.9 MHz	88.3 MHz	90.5 MHz	92.7 MHz	—N/a	—N/a	Serves Windermere (relayed via Morecambe Bay).

== Gallery ==
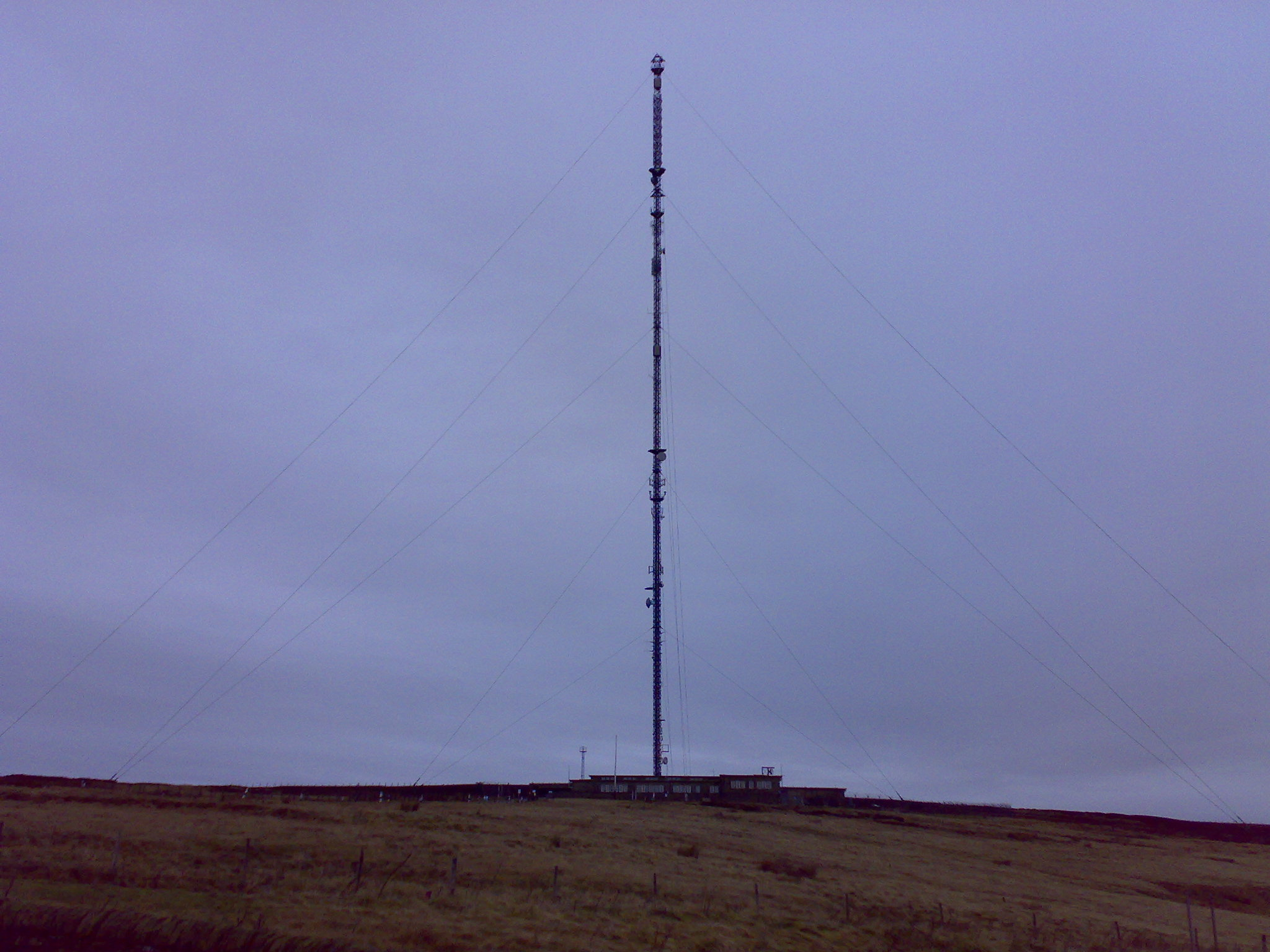
Holme Moss mast and transmitter buildings

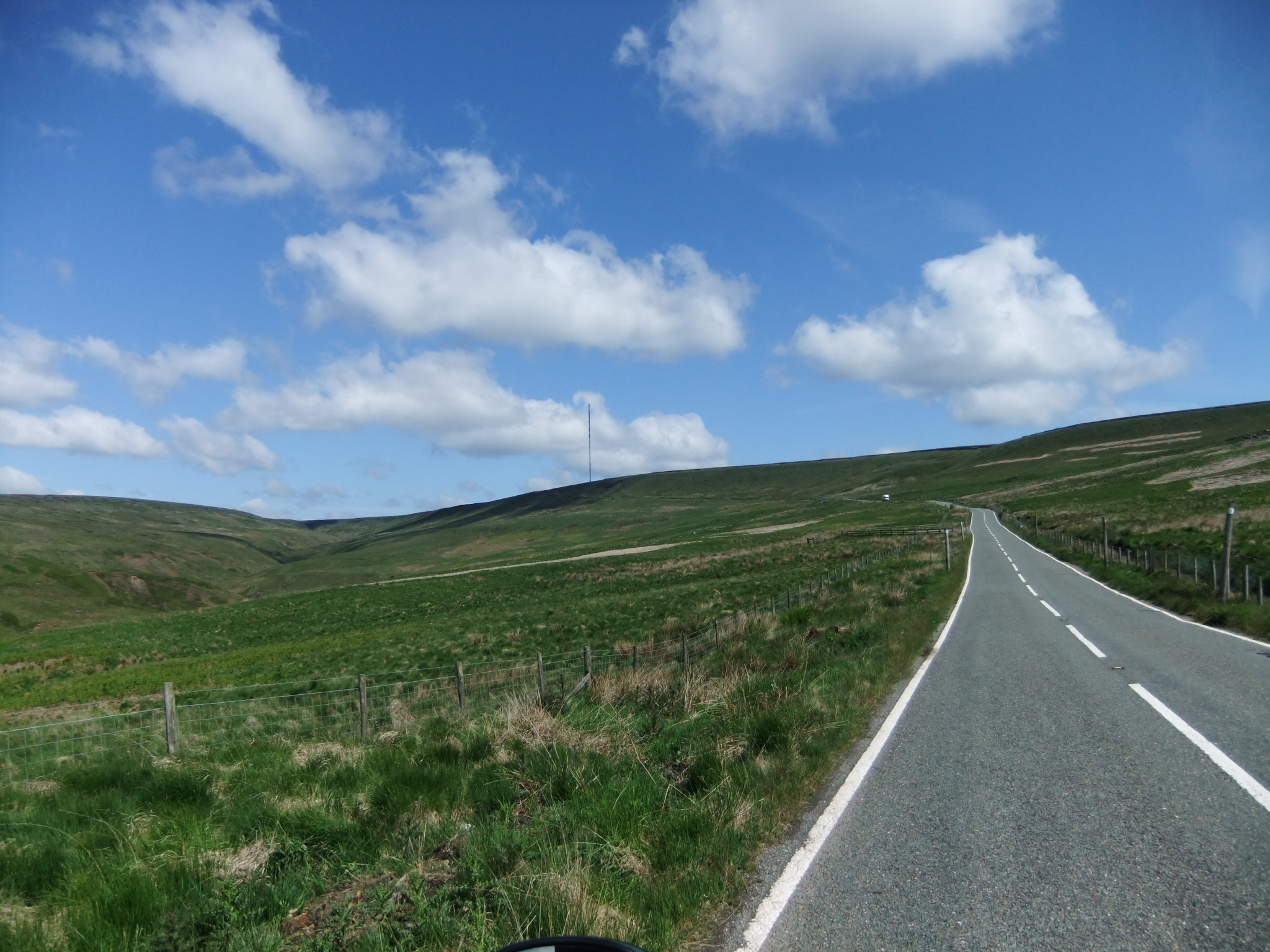
Holme Moss, near summit from west side

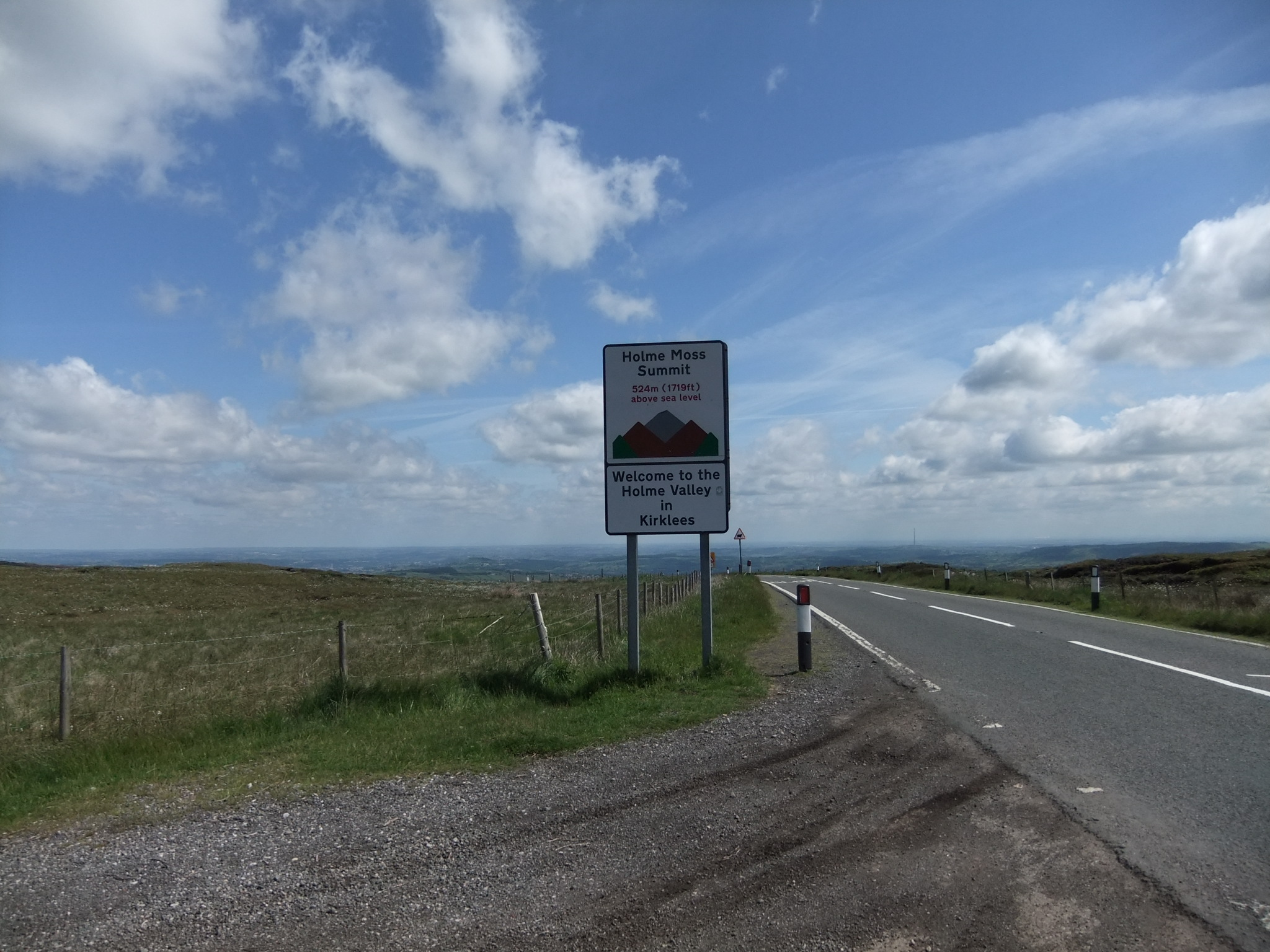
Holme Moss, eastward view from top

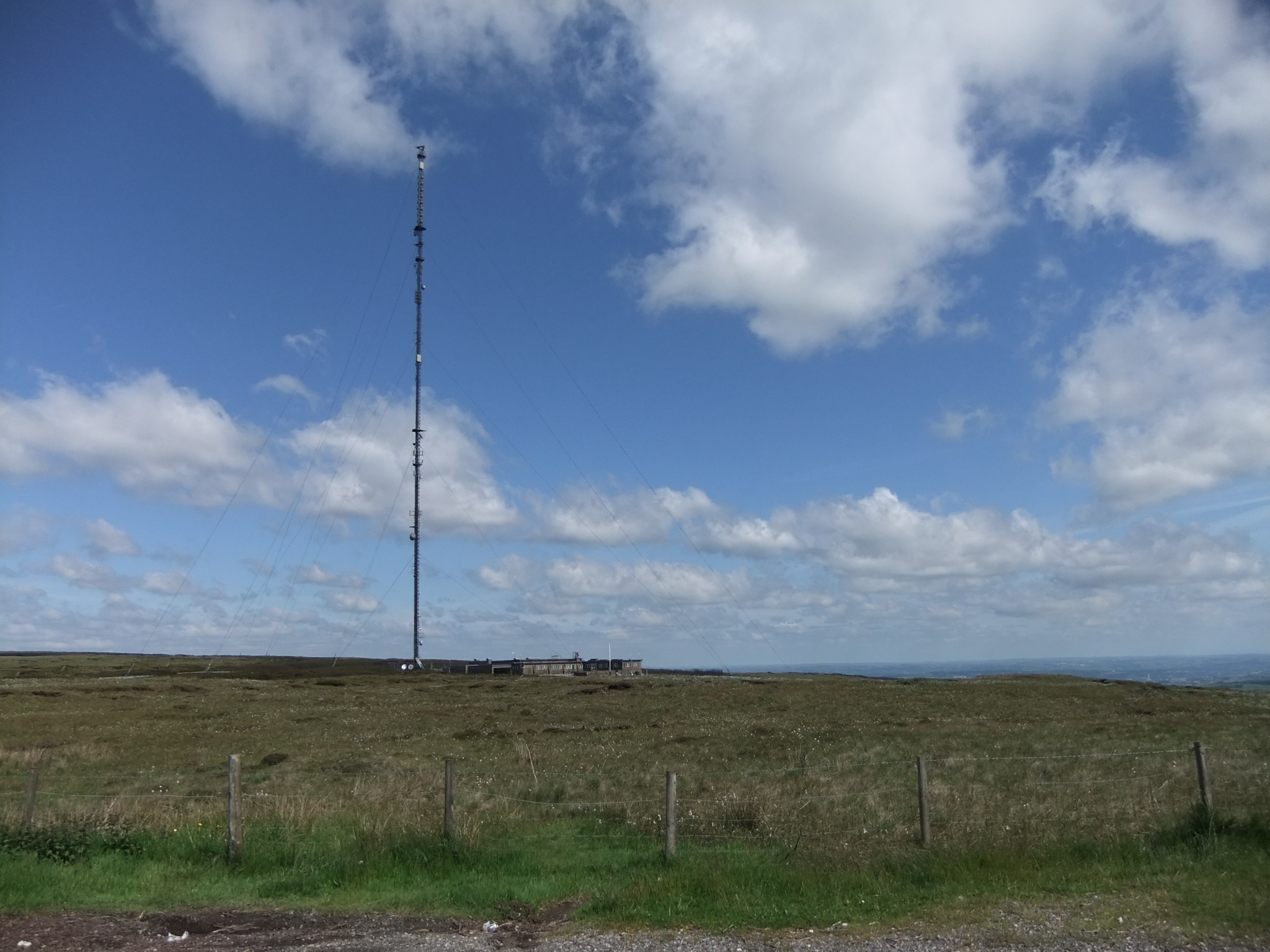
Holme Moss, transmitter mast and buildings

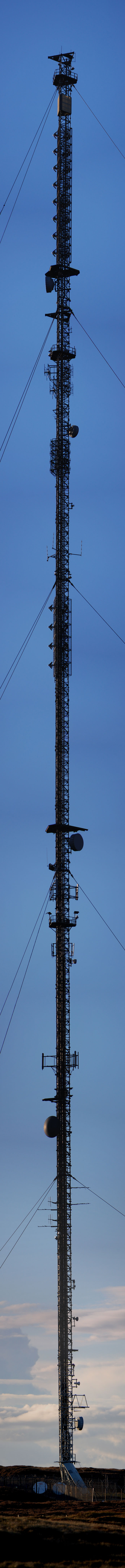
A panorama generated from 17 images

== See also ==
- Holme Moss
- List of masts
- List of tallest structures in the United Kingdom

== Sources ==
- Ritchie, Berry (1997). The Good Builder: The John Laing Story. James & James.
