= John Humphreys Davies =

Welsh lawyer and educator (1871–1926)

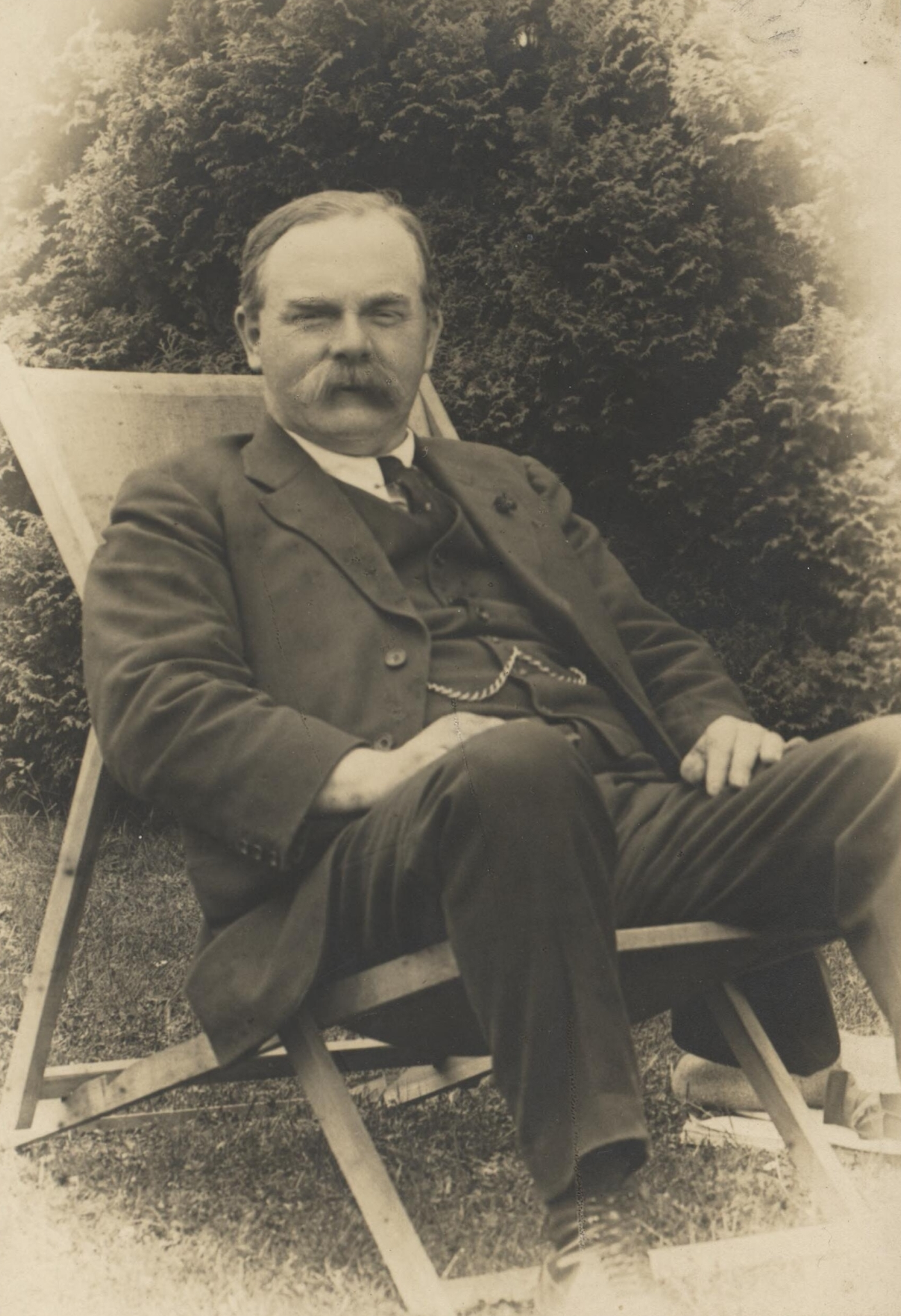
Davies in 1926

John Humphreys Davies (15 April 1871 – 10 August 1926) was a Welsh lawyer, bibliographer and educator. He joined the movement to start a National Library of Wales.

== Family and schooling ==
Born at Llangeitho, Ceredigion, he was one of the children of Robert J. Davies, Cwrtmawr. He was educated at the University College of Wales, Aberystwyth and Lincoln College, Oxford, before being called to the bar at Lincoln's Inn. His sister Annie looked after him and his brother Walter for a time when they were students in London.

== Welsh literature ==
Davies's interest in Welsh literature is associated with O. M. Edwards at Oxford and his brother-in-law, T. E. Ellis.

Along with Sir John Williams, who became his president while Principal at Aberystwyth, Davies was involved in the movement to establish a National Library for Wales. He collected many Welsh books and manuscripts and they became part of the National Library of Wales after his death. He also wrote several several books and journal articles. He was a founder of the Calvinistic Methodist Historical Society and was the editor of the Journal of the Welsh Bibliographical Society for a decade.

He was President of Aberystwyth Old Students' Association in 1907–1908.

== Public life ==
From an early age Davies became involved in public life, being elected an alderman of Cardiganshire County Council in 1895 at the age of 24, while not yet an elected councillor. He gained some support in that year as the new Liberal candidate for Cardiganshire in succession to Bowen Rowlands. The nomination, however, went to Matthew Vaughan-Davies.

Davies served as Chairman of Cardiganshire County Council in 1916–1917.

In 1905 he became Registrar of his alma mater and principal in 1919, a position which he held until his death at the age of 55.

Academic offices
Preceded by Thomas Francis Roberts	Principal of the University College of Wales Aberystwyth; 1919–1926	Succeeded by Sir Henry Stuart-Jones
Professional and academic associations
Preceded by Austin Keen	President of the Aberystwyth Old Students' Association; 1907–08	Succeeded by John Mortimer Angus

== Bibliography ==
- Morgan, Kenneth O. (1967). "Cardiganshire Politics: The Liberal Ascendancy 1885-1923". Ceredigion. 5 (4): 311–346.
