= Derek John Blundell =

British geologist (1933–2023)

Derek John Blundell (1933 – 24 November 2023) was a British geologist who was emeritus professor of geophysics at Royal Holloway, University of London.

Blundell was president of the Geological Society from 1988 to 1990 and awarded the Society's Coke Medal in 1993.

Blundell died on 24 November 2023, at the age of 90.

== Selected works ==
- Hall, Robert; Blundell, Derek John (1996), Tectonic evolution of southeast Asia, Geological Society, ISBN 978-1-897799-52-9
- Blundell, Derek John; Scott, Andrew C. (1998), Lyell: the past is the key to the present, Geological Society, ISBN 978-1-86239-018-8
- Blundell, Derek John; Neubauer, Franz; Quadt, Albrecht (2002), The timing and location of major ore deposits in an evolving orogen, Geological Society, ISBN 978-1-86239-122-2
