= David Jenkins (librarian) =

Welsh librarian

David Jenkins CBE
- Born: 29 May 1912; Blaenclydach, Rhondda, Wales
- Died: 6 March 2002 (aged 89); Aberystwyth, Wales
- Occupation: Librarian

David Jenkins CBE (29 May 1912 – 6 March 2002) was the Librarian of the National Library of Wales from 1969 to 1979 and author of an official history of the library.

== Biography ==
Jenkins was born in Blaenclydach, Rhondda the son of an Aberaeron-born collier but, as a consequence of illness, spent most of his childhood with an aunt and uncle in Penrhyn-coch, Aberystwyth, Ceredigion. He was educated at Ardwyn Grammar School, Aberystwyth; and the University College of Wales, Aberystwyth, graduating BA with Honours in Welsh Literature, 1936, and MA in 1948. In 1979 an Hon. DLitt Wales was conferred on him.

He was employed at the National Library of Wales in 1939 as an assistant in the Department of Manuscripts. Conscripted into the Army, he served during World War II as a major in north-western Europe, "taking part in the liberation of Paris and the push into Germany and Poland, where he was among the first British soldiers to reach the concentration camps". He resumed his career at the National Library, becoming an Assistant Keeper in the Department of Printed Books from 1949 to 1957. He was later appointed Keeper, 1957–1962, Senior Keeper, 1962–1969, and, finally, Librarian, 1969–1979.

He was the editor of the Journal of the Welsh Bibliographical Society from 1964 to 1979, and editor of the National Library of Wales Journal from 1968 to 1979. He served as the General Commissioner of Income Tax 1968–1987 and the chairman of the Welsh Books Council from 1974 to 1980.

Jenkins received a CBE in 1977. His history of the National Library, A Refuge in Peace and War, was written over a 20-year period.

He died, aged 89, in Aberystwyth on 6 March 2002.

== Personal life ==
Jenkins married Menna Rhys, the only daughter of the Rev. Owen Evans Williams of Penrhyn-coch, in 1948. They had one son and one daughter.

== Bibliography ==
- A Refuge in Peace and War: The National Library of Wales to 1952 (NLW, 2002)
- Thomas Gwynn Jones (Gwasg Gee, 1973)
- Bro a Bywyd Thomas Gwynn Jones 1871-1949 (Cyngor Y Celfyddydau, 1984)
- Bro Dafydd ap Gwilym (Cymdeithas Lyfrau Ceredigion, 1992)
- O Blas Gogerddan i Horeb (Taith Dwy Ganrif) (Gwasg Llyfrgell Genedlaethol Cymru, 1993)

Academic offices
Preceded by E. D. Jones	Librarian of the National Library of Wales; 1969–1979	Succeeded by R. Geraint Gruffydd
