= Y Drysorfa =

- Categories: Calvinistic Methodism
- Publisher: Methodist Calvinistic Church of Wales
- First issue: 1819
- Final issue: 1968
- Country: Wales
- Language: Welsh

Y Drysorfa was a Calvinistic Methodist publication produced in Wales and written in the Welsh language. Although published intermittently before 1830, it became a regular publication in 1831, when preacher John Parry became its editor.

== Publication history ==
Y Drysorfa was first published in 1819 as a monthly publication. However, it ceased publication in 1823. It was restarted in 1831 as a quarterly publication, and two of its early editors included Thomas Jones and Thomas Charles, leading figures in the religious and educational development of Wales.

Y Drysorfa, under the editorship of John Parry, became a monthly periodical published by the Calvinistic Methodist Church of Wales, originally dealing with the Methodist faith, and featured columns such as Hanesiaeth Cenhadol, a regular column containing letters from missionaries around the world. Y Drysorfa became a periodical that would also publish poems and literary work from ministers, preachers and its general readership, and was the first publication to serialize Daniel Owen's earliest work, including the novel Rhys Lewis.

On 26 August 1843, Sir Hugh Owen, wrote in the publication his 'Letter to the Welsh People', regarding the adoption of day schools, which resulted in the appointment of an agent of the British and Foreign Schools Society in North Wales.

The publication ran for over a hundred years, finally folding in 1968.

== Bibliography ==
- Davies, John; Jenkins, Nigel (2008). The Welsh Academy Encyclopaedia of Wales. Cardiff: University of Wales Press. ISBN 978-0-7083-1953-6.
