= Mari Ellis =

Welsh writer and women's rights activist

Mari Gwendoline Ellis (born Mary Gwendoline Headley, 21 July 1913 – 25 January 2015), was a Welsh writer and women's rights activist. She wrote for and edited Welsh-language newspapers, and wrote a survey of Welsh parish churches, as well as three novels. Her husband was academic Thomas Iorwerth Ellis, and her daughter the writer Meg Ann Elis.

== Life ==
Ellis was born in Dylife, Montgomeryshire, the youngest of four children of the Reverend Richard Llewelyn Headley and his wife Margaret. Ellis graduated BA Hons in Welsh in 1936 at the then University College of North Wales (now Bangor University), and MA in 1938. Having worked at various public libraries in both Wales and England, in 1944 she was appointed to the National Library of Wales, Aberystwyth. She married Thomas Iorwerth Ellis in 1949. Their daughter is the writer Meg Ann Elis; they also had a son.

Ellis edited 'Tŷ Ni', a woman's section of the Welsh-language newspaper Y Cymro for nine years, and published Ffenest y Gegin in 1965. She also had a column in Y Llan for many years. Ellis edited Yr Angor, the local Welsh language paper (papur bro) for the Aberystwyth area. With her daughter, Ellis wrote a survey of Welsh parish churches. She also wrote a series of articles on the literary churchmen and lay women of Wales known as the Yr Hen Bersoniaid Llengar. Whilst some scholarly articles were published, much of her work including a biography of Gwallter Mechain, remained unpublished.

Ellis wrote three novels, Awelon Darowen (Llandybïe, published 1965), Beth yw'r Haf...? (Llandysul, 1974) and Ystyriwch Lili (Talybont, 1988).

Ellis was devout, and active in the Church of Wales, attending Eglwys y Santes Fair (St Mary’s) in Aberystwyth. She was also active in a number of organisations such as the Mothers’ Union.

After her husband’s death in 1970, Ellis edited some of his books for publication. Ellis died in Aberystwyth in 2015.

== Works ==
- Ffenest y Gegin 1965
- Y Golau Gwan - the love letters of T. E. Ellis
