= Holme Moss =

Moorland in the Peak District, England

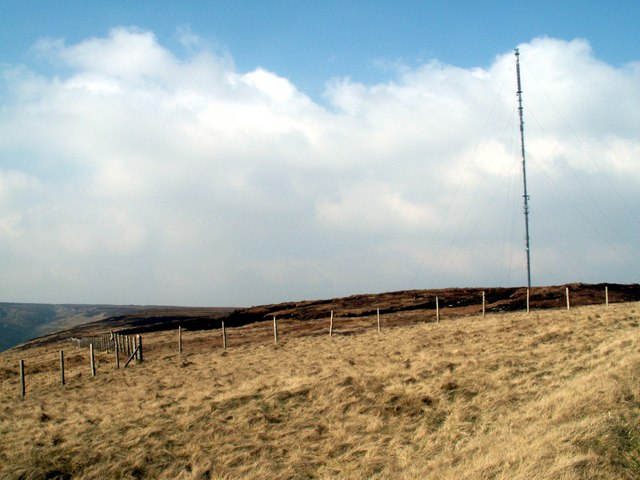
- Holme Moss towards Holme Moss transmitting station

Highest point
- Elevation: 524 m (1,719 ft)
- Coordinates: 53°31′58.87″N 1°51′26.61″W

Geography
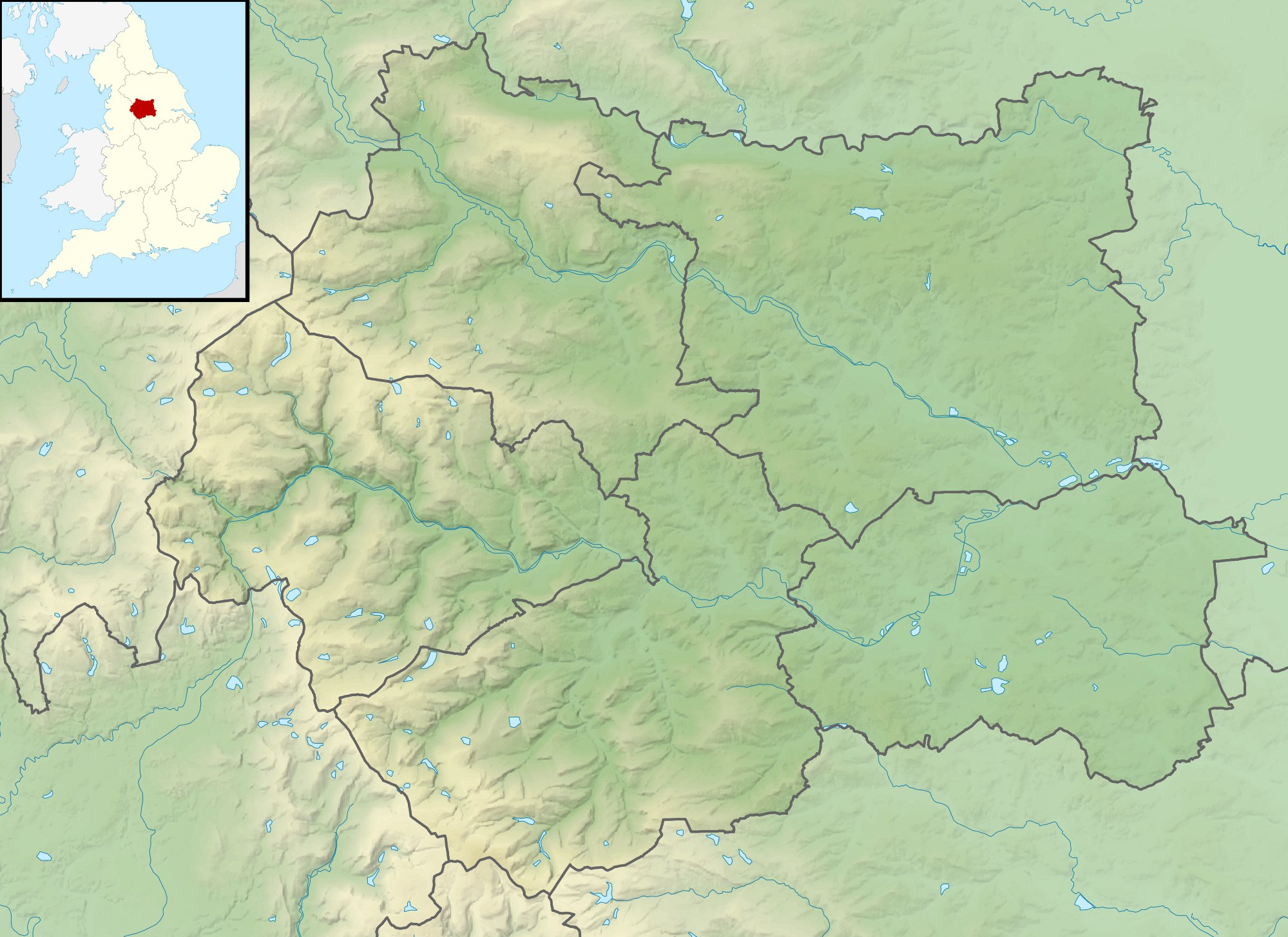
- Location within West Yorkshire
- Location: Holme Valley, West Yorkshire, England
- Parent range: Peak District
- OS grid: SE095040

Holme Moss (1,719 feet or 524 metres a.s.l.) is high moorland on the border between the Holme Valley district of Kirklees in West Yorkshire and the High Peak district of Derbyshire in England. Historically on the boundary between the West Riding of Yorkshire and Cheshire, it is within the boundary of the Peak District National Park. The A6024 road between Holmfirth and Longdendale crosses the moor near its highest point close to Holme Moss transmitting station's prominent mast.

== Watershed ==
Water seeping from the surrounding moorland into Rake Dike is the source of the River Holme. Rake Dike rising from Kay Edge on the moor flows through the village of Holme into Brownhill Reservoir, about a mile below the moor, and passes down through the Holme Valley to Huddersfield, where it flows into the River Colne. The upper part of the moor continues into Black Hill which is crossed by the Pennine Way north–south footpath.

== Transmitting station ==
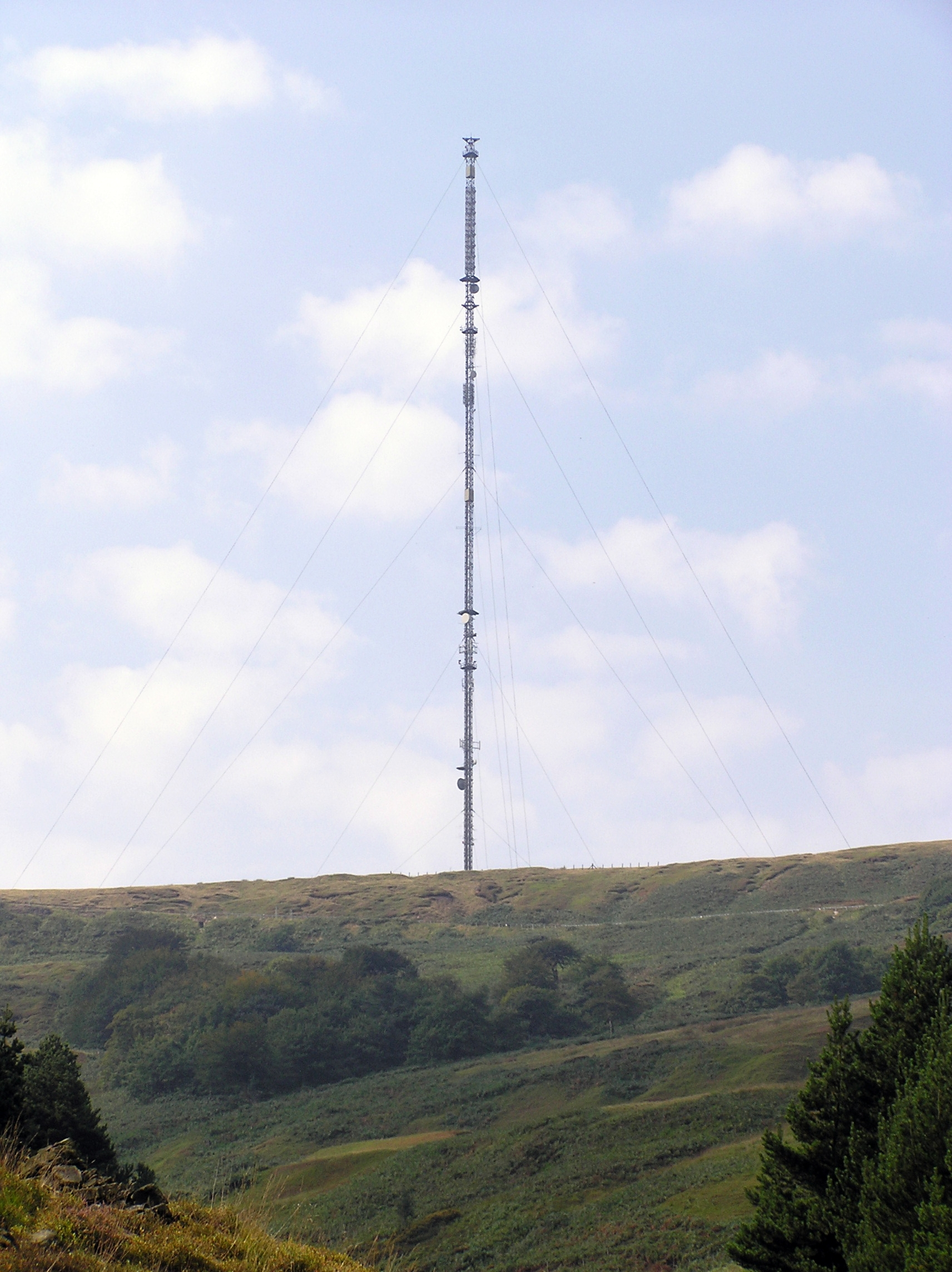
Holme Moss radio transmitter

Holme Moss transmitting station is the highest in England. Now it provides VHF coverage for FM and DAB to a wide area around the transmitter including West Yorkshire, South Yorkshire, Greater Manchester and parts of Cheshire, Derbyshire and Nottinghamshire. The FM signals operate at 250 kW from one of the most powerful transmitters in the country with reception available as far north as the Borders, as far south as Birmingham, and to the east and west coasts. Emley Moor transmitting station (55.44°, 15.53 km) and Moorside Edge transmitting station (348.22°, 11.56 km) can be seen from the location.

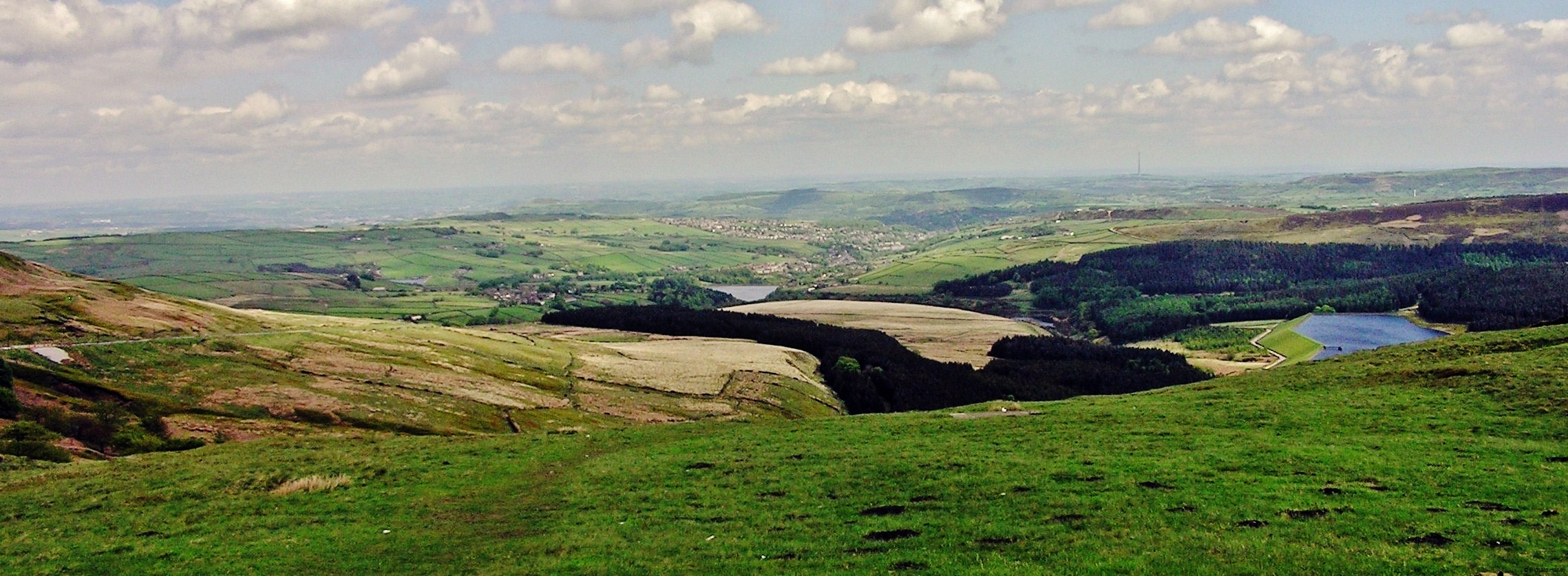
View from Holme Moss

== Transport ==
In the winter Holme Moss frequently gets a covering of snow and the road over the moor is often the first in the area to be blocked. Kirklees Highways department clears the road as far as the border with Derbyshire. Derbyshire County Council Highways Authority is responsible for clearing the southern side.

== Sport ==
=== Athletics ===
Holmfirth Harriers Athletics Club organise an annual "Holme Moss Fell Race" on and around Holme Moss in the summer. The race starts at Cartworth Moor cricket ground, crosses Ramsden Clough to Holme Moss, crosses and descends to Crowden before returning via Bareholme Moss, Laddow Rocks and Black Hill.

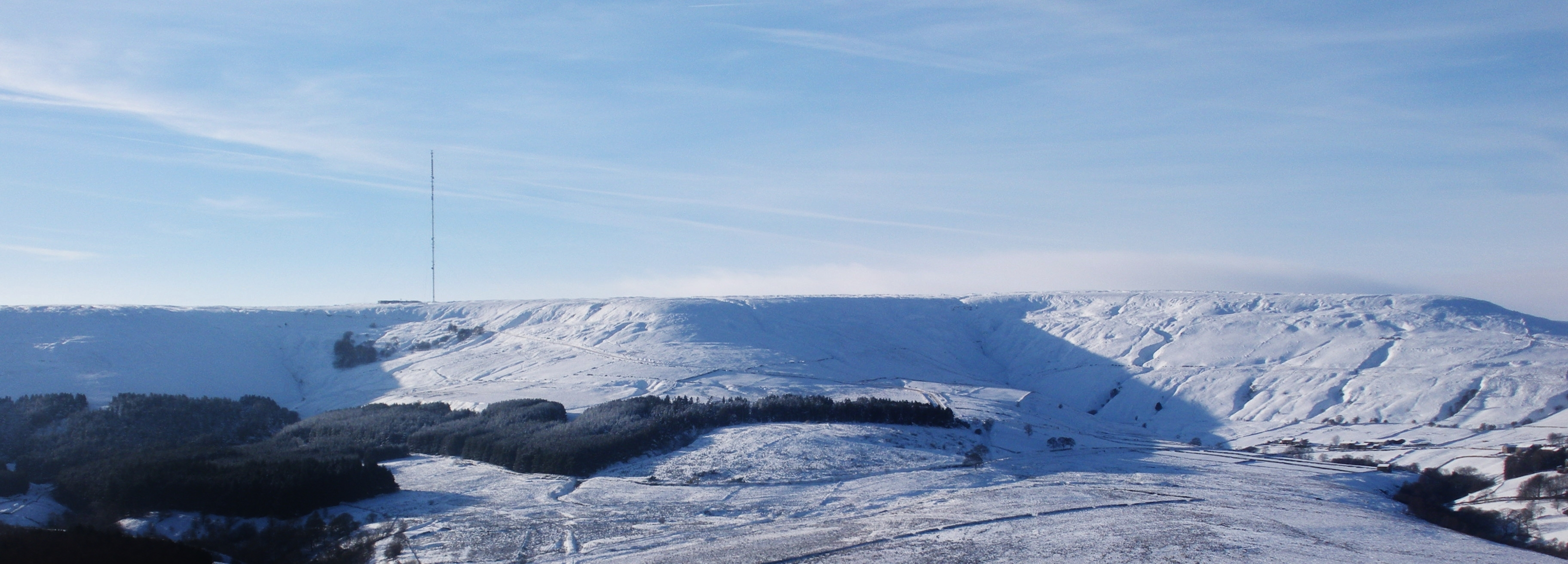
Holme Moss in winter, viewed from Ramsden Road

=== Cycling ===
Holme Moss
- Start: Holmfirth
- Gain in altitude: 394 m (1,293 ft)
- Length of climb: 7.0 km (4.3 mi)
- Maximum elevation: 524 m (1,719 ft)
- Average gradient: 5.6 %
- Maximum gradient: 11 %

To British cycling enthusiasts, Holme Moss has become synonymous with the A6024 (Woodhead Road) which crosses the moor, between the village of Holmbridge to the north and the Woodhead Reservoir to the south. The northern side in particular is one of England's best known bicycle ascents, and has acquired a reputation as among the country's more difficult climbs. It has often been used for domestic competition in British road racing and mountain biking.

==== Climbs ====
Starting from Holmfirth, to the north, the climb is 7 km (4.3 mi) long, gaining 394 m (1,293 ft) in altitude, at an average gradient of 5.6%, although the penultimate kilometre is at a gradient of 11%.

From the south, the climb starts at the junction with the A628, from where it is 4 km (2.5 mi) long, with a height gain of 274 m (899 ft) at an average gradient of 6.9%.

==== "Le Col de Moss" ====
Although not comparable in distance with the cols of European bicycle racing, the length and difficulty of Holme Moss relative to other British climbs has made it a frequent and popular inclusion in British races, including the Tour of Britain. For many years the (now defunct) Leeds Classic race saw internationally renowned riders (many of them, such as Bjarne Riis, veterans of the Tour de France) tackling the climb.

==== Tour de France ====
The second stage of the 2014 Tour de France followed the route across the Pennines to Derbyshire. The leader over the summit was Blel Kadri from France.
