= Llangeitho =

Village and community in Ceredigion, Wales

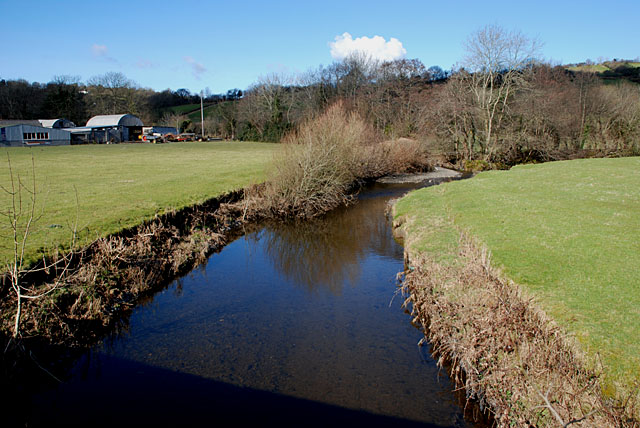
- Afon Aeron at Llangeitho

- Location within Ceredigion
- Population: 819
- OS grid reference: SN679597
- Community: Llangeitho
- Principal area: Ceredigion
- Preserved county: Dyfed
- Country: Wales
- Sovereign state: United Kingdom
- Post town: Tregaron
- Postcode district: SY25
- Dialling code: 01974
- Police: Dyfed-Powys
- Fire: Mid and West Wales
- Ambulance: Welsh
- UK Parliament: Ceredigion Preseli
- Senedd Cymru – Welsh Parliament: Ceredigion Penfro
- List of places UK Wales Ceredigion 52.22°N 4.02°W Community map: Map of the community

Llangeitho is a village and community on the upper River Aeron in Ceredigion, Wales, about four miles (6 km) west of Tregaron and 11 kilometres (7 mi) north of Lampeter. Its population of 874 in 2001 fell to 819 at the 2011 census.

== Nonconformism ==
The village is linked with Daniel Rowland, born here in 1713, and the Welsh Methodist revival in the 18th century. Rowland served as curate at Llangeitho and Nantcwnlle. The village chapel, built in 1760, became famous throughout Wales as a Calvinistic Methodist centre. Thousands visited it to hear the preaching. Rowland was buried in the village and there remains a memorial column to him. Larger replacement chapels were built in 1764 and 1814.

Llangeitho saw several further periods of religious revival in that century, the strongest in 1762, when rejoicing, dancing and jumping for joy earned the Welsh Methodists the nickname "Jumpers". William Williams Pantycelyn wrote in defence of the celebrations.

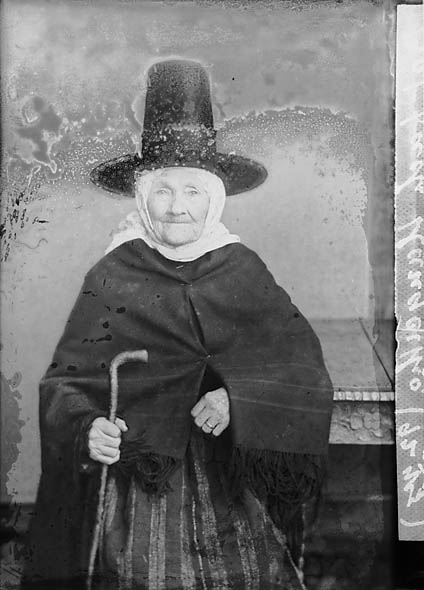
A local character in around 1885: Bet Fach at age 92.

== Language ==
Like much of Ceredigion, Llangeitho was a stronghold of the Welsh language, but in the 1970s newcomers contributed to a decline in the proportion of habitual Welsh speakers from 83 per cent in 1971 to 55 per cent in 2011. By the 2021 census the percentage was down to 47%.

The Welsh-language poet and minstrel Dafydd Llwyd Mathau (c. 1601–1629) is thought to have come from the Llangeitho area.

About a mile and half (2.4 km) north of the village is the mansion of Cwrt Mawr, where the antiquary J. H. Davies (1871–1926) built up a valuable collection of Welsh-language manuscripts known as the Cwrtmawr manuscripts. He donated them to the National Library of Wales, where they remain.

== Church ==
The village church, across the river to the north of the village, is on an ancient site, but the current church was wholly rebuilt in 1821, retaining nothing of the medieval fabric, which included a double rood screen and three arches.

The church and parish are named after St Ceitho. The water of St Ceitho's Spring is said to have the peculiarity of being cool in summer and tepid in winter.

== School ==
The village primary school, Ysgol Gymunedol Llangeitho, changed names in 2012 due to an amalgamation becoming Ysgol Rhos y Helyg. The nearest secondary school is Ysgol Henry Richard in Tregaron, which teaches in Welsh and English.

The earliest record of a school in the village marks the foundation of a mixed, Calvinistic Methodist school there in 1821.

== Governance ==
Llangeitho gained a seat on Cardiganshire County Council in 1889. In November 2019, the Llangeitho member of what is now Ceredigion County Council was David Rhodri Wyn Evans. The ward extends to some neighbouring communities, giving a population of 1,459.
