= 1985 in Wales =

- Centuries: 18th; 19th; 20th; 21st
- Decades: 1960s; 1970s; 1980s; 1990s; 2000s
- See also: List of years in Wales; Timeline of Welsh history 1985 in The United Kingdom England Scotland Elsewhere

This article is about the particular significance of the year 1985 to Wales and its people.

== Incumbents ==
- Secretary of State for Wales – Nicholas Edwards
- Archbishop of Wales – Derrick Childs, Bishop of Monmouth
- Archdruid of the National Eisteddfod of Wales – Elerydd

== Events ==
- 3 March – The UK miners' strike (1984–85) formally ends. Among the mines not reopening is Bedwas Navigation Colliery.
- 16 May – Dean Hancock and Russell Shankland are convicted of murder at Cardiff Crown Court and jailed for life. The previous November, at the height of the miners' strike, they had caused the death of a taxi driver by dropping a concrete block onto his car as it passed under a bridge.
- 29 June – The A55 Colwyn Bay bypass is completed.
- 4 July – At the Brecon and Radnor by-election (caused by the death of sitting Conservative MP Tom Ellis Hooson) local farmer Richard Livsey takes the seat for the Liberals.
- 25 July – Clwydian Range AONB is designated.
- 20 December – Swansea City A.F.C., struggling in the English Third Division just three years after being in the First, are issued with a winding-up order in the High Court and are at risk of closure and being forced out of the Football League.
- exact date unknown
  - Terry Matthews sells his stake in Mitel to British Telecom.
  - "Cefn" is founded to campaign for the civil rights of Welsh speakers.
  - The Centre for Advanced Welsh and Celtic Studies is founded at the University of Wales, Aberystwyth.
  - Seventeen women are prosecuted on conspiracy charges after the occupation of a nuclear bunker near Carmarthen.

== Arts and literature ==
- Robat Powell becomes the first Welsh learner to win the Chair at the National Eisteddfod (see below).

=== Awards ===
- National Eisteddfod of Wales (held in Rhyl)
- National Eisteddfod of Wales: Chair - Robat Powell
- National Eisteddfod of Wales: Crown - John Roderick Rees
- National Eisteddfod of Wales: Prose Medal - Margaret Dafydd

=== New books ===
==== English language ====
- Alice Thomas Ellis – Unexplained Laughter
- Lady Olwen Carey Evans – Lloyd George Was My Father
- David Hughes – The Pork Butcher
- Christopher Meredith – This
- Robert Minhinnick – The Dinosaur Park
- John Powell Ward – The Clearing
- Ivor Wilks – South Wales and the Rising of 1839

==== Welsh language ====
- Geraint Bowen – Cerddi
- Bryan Martin Davies – Lleoedd
- Glanmor Williams
  - Harri Tudur a Chymru
  - Grym Tafodau Tân
- Eluned Phillips – Cerddi Glyn-y-Mêl

=== Music ===
- Downtown Julie Brown makes her debut on Club MTV.
- "Dwylo Dros y Môr", performed by various artists, is the Welsh charity song released in coordination with Band Aid.

==== Albums ====
- Aled Jones – Aled Jones With The BBC Welsh Chorus
- Living Legends – Better Dead Than Wed
- Eirlys Parri – Yfory

== Film ==
- Jonathan Pryce stars in Brazil.
- Richard Marquand directs Jagged Edge.

=== Welsh-language films ===
- None

== Broadcasting ==
=== Welsh-language television ===
- Helfa Drysor
- Sam Tân (Fireman Sam)

=== English-language television ===
- 10 September – ITV broadcasts the Wales vs Scotland World Cup qualifying match live from Ninian Park in Cardiff. Scotland manager Jock Stein collapses and dies in the stadium's first aid room.
- The Dragon Has Two Tongues, co-presented by Gwyn Alf Williams and Wynford Vaughan-Thomas

== Sport ==
- BBC Wales Sports Personality of the Year – Steve Jones
- Horse racing – Hywel Davies wins the Grand National on "Last Suspect".

== Births ==
- 2 January – Mark Evans, musical theatre actor, singer, dancer and choreographer
- 9 January – Elen Evans, rugby player
- 3 March – David Davies, swimmer
- 8 April – Gareth Rees, cricketer
- 13 May
  - Iwan Rheon, screen actor
  - Danny Thomas, footballer
- 31 May – Laura Daniels, lawn bowler
- 16 June – Craig Morgan, footballer
- 17 July – Tom Cullen, actor
- 30 August – Richard Duffy, international footballer and manager
- 11 September – Daniel Parslow, footballer
- 19 September – Alun Wyn Jones, international rugby union captain
- 24 September – Kimberley Nixon, actress
- 10 October – Marina Lambrini Diamandis, singer
- 14 December – Alex Pennie, musician
- 15 November – Simon Spender, footballer
- 25 December
  - Leon Pisani, pop singer
  - Perdita Weeks, actress
- 28 December – Nicola Davies, footballer
- date unknown – Claire Jones, harpist

== Deaths ==
- 19 January – Tom Richards, athlete, 74
- 26 January – David Ormsby-Gore, 5th Baron Harlech, 66 (car accident)
- 9 March – John Tudor Jones, journalist, poet, critic, broadcaster, and translator, 81
- 29 March – Rae Jenkins, violinist and conductor
- 4 April – Kate Roberts, author, 94
- 21 April – Owen Temple-Morris, barrister and politician, 88
- 22 April – Sir Thomas Parry, academic, 80
- 8 May – Tom Hooson, politician, 52 (cancer)
- 9 June – Clifford Evans, actor, 73
- July - Roger Ashton (footballer), footballer, 63
- 1 September – Saunders Lewis, writer, 91
- 14 September – Niel Morgan, cricketer and diplomat, 81
- 17 September – Laura Ashley, designer, 60 (brain haemorrhage after fall)
- 18 September – Iorwerth Evans, rugby player, 79
- 28 October
  - Harold Davies, Baron Davies of Leek, politician, 81
  - Leslie Harris, cricketer, 70
- 4 November – Hilda Vaughan, novelist, 93
- 17 December – Gwyn Richards, dual-code rugby player, 79
- 27 December – Len Richards, footballer, 74
- date unknown – Dewi-Prys Thomas, architect

== See also ==
- 1985 in England
- 1985 in Northern Ireland
- 1985 in Scotland
