= Chris Butler (politician) =

British politician

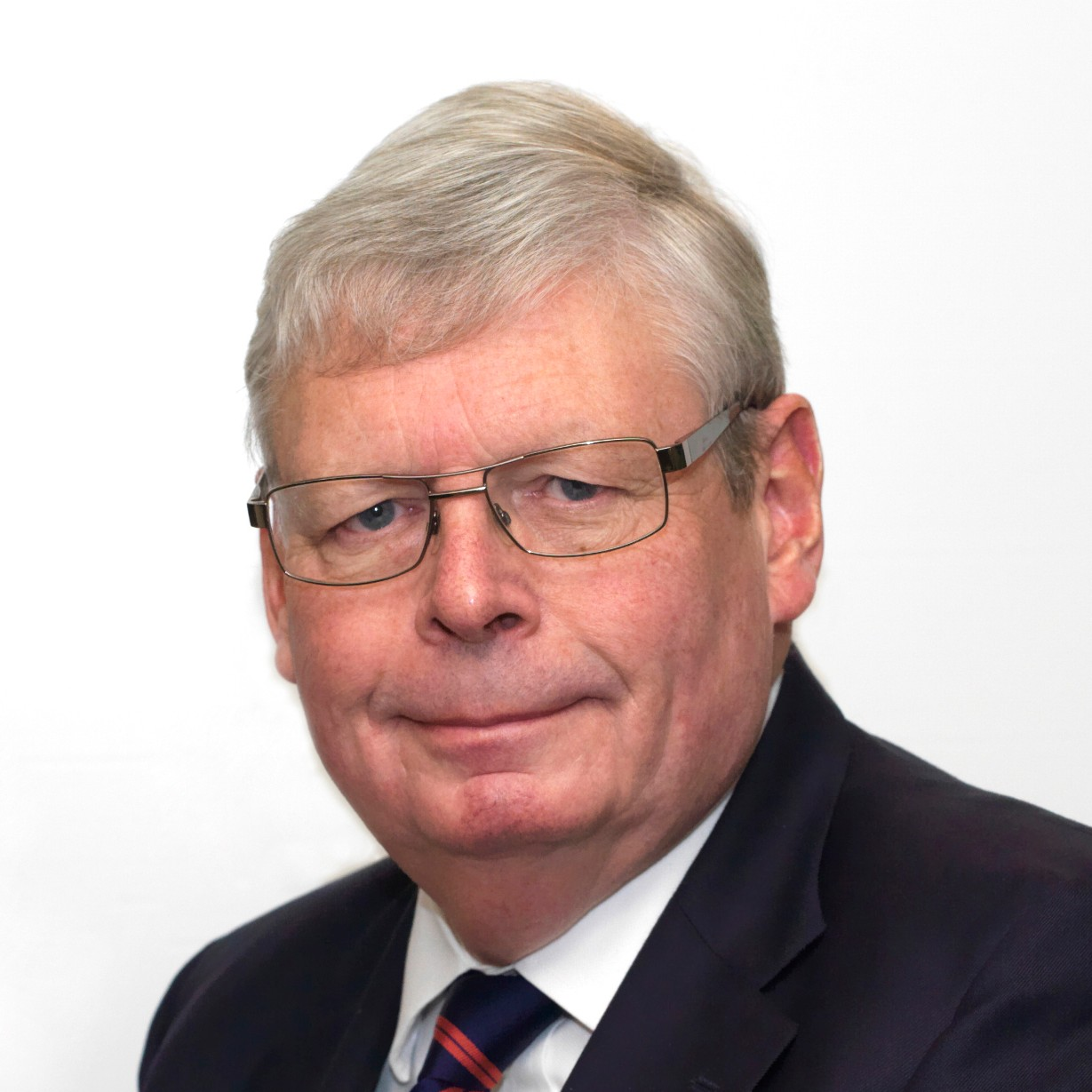

Member of Parliament for Warrington South
- In office 11 June 1987 – 16 March 1992
- Preceded by: Mark Carlisle
- Succeeded by: Mike Hall

Personal details
- Born: 12 August 1950
- Died: 3 May 2026 (aged 75)
- Party: Reform UK
- Other political affiliations: Conservative (until 2019)
- Education: Emmanuel College, Cambridge

Christopher John Butler (12 August 1950 – 3 May 2026) was a British politician and public affairs consultant who served as the Conservative Party Member of Parliament (MP) for Warrington South from 1987 to 1992.

== Early life and education ==
Butler was born in Cardiff on 12 August 1950, the son of a local general practitioner, Dr John Butler. He grew up in Llanishen and attended Ton-yr-ywen Primary School in Heath and Cardiff High School for Boys. He won an Open Exhibition in modern languages to Emmanuel College, Cambridge, where he studied archaeology and anthropology, later specialising in physical anthropology.

== Early career ==
After university, Butler worked in market research in Cardiff before joining the Conservative Party's research staff in Wales, based in Whitchurch. There he wrote Cymraeg: Iaith Ein Plant? ("Welsh: Our Children's Language?"), a policy paper on promoting the Welsh language. In 1980 he joined the Conservative Research Department, working in the Political Office at 10 Downing Street under Margaret Thatcher. In 1983 he was appointed Special Adviser to the Secretary of State for Wales, Nicholas Edwards.

== Parliamentary career ==
Butler first stood for Parliament as the Conservative candidate at the 1985 Brecon and Radnor by-election, a closely fought contest in which he finished second to the Liberal candidate, Richard Livsey.

At the 1987 general election he was elected Member of Parliament (MP) for Warrington South, succeeding Mark Carlisle. He represented the constituency until the 1992 general election, narrowly losing the seat to Labour's Mike Hall by 191 votes.

== Later career ==
After leaving Parliament, Butler worked in public affairs. In 1998 he co-founded Butler Kelly, a cross-party public affairs consultancy in Westminster, which he ran until his retirement in 2015. His firm worked for the Welsh-language broadcaster S4C during the passage of the Broadcasting Act 1996, lobbying for increased digital multiplex capacity and commercial freedom, both of which were included in the Act.

He stood as second on the Conservative list in Wales at the 1999 European Parliament election, and as a Conservative candidate in South Wales East at the 2016 National Assembly for Wales election. At the 2019 general election he stood for the Brexit Party in Cardiff North, where he had grown up. He later joined Reform UK.

== Writings and interests ==
Butler was described as a gifted linguist who spoke seven languages. He wrote about Cardiff and Welsh culture, including ''Cardiff Mysteries: Remastered'', a book of puzzles illustrated with Edwardian postcards of the city, and, with his sister Virginia Butler, ''100 Reasons to Celebrate Welsh History'' (The History Press). He was a keen collector of postcards (a deltiologist).

== Death ==
Butler died on 3 May 2026, aged 75, following a short illness.

== Bibliography ==
- The Times Guide to the House of Commons, Times Newspapers Ltd, 1992
- Leigh Rayment's Historical List of MPs

Parliament of the United Kingdom
Preceded by Mark Carlisle	Member of Parliament for Warrington South; 1987 – 1992	Succeeded by Mike Hall
