= Honourable and Loyal Society of Antient Britons =

The Honourable and Loyal Society of Antient Britons was a London-based Welsh social, cultural, and philanthropic society, which was in existence from 1715 until the end of the 18th century.

== History ==
The society was established at the beginning of 1715, shortly after the death of Queen Anne and the accession of the Hanoverian George I. It was in origin a loyalist body, founded to distance the London Welsh community from any suggestion of Jacobite sympathies. The society's name was chosen to emphasise the claims of the Welsh to be the original Celtic Britons. The principal founder was Thomas Jones (d. 1731) of Lincoln's Inn (believed to be a native of Bridgend). Jones gained the support of a prominent Welsh nobleman, the Earl of Lisburne; and took advantage of the coincidence of the birthday of Caroline, Princess of Wales, falling on 1 March, Saint David's Day, to invite her to become the society's patron. The Prince of Wales subsequently agreed to become the society's President, and Jones himself received a knighthood.

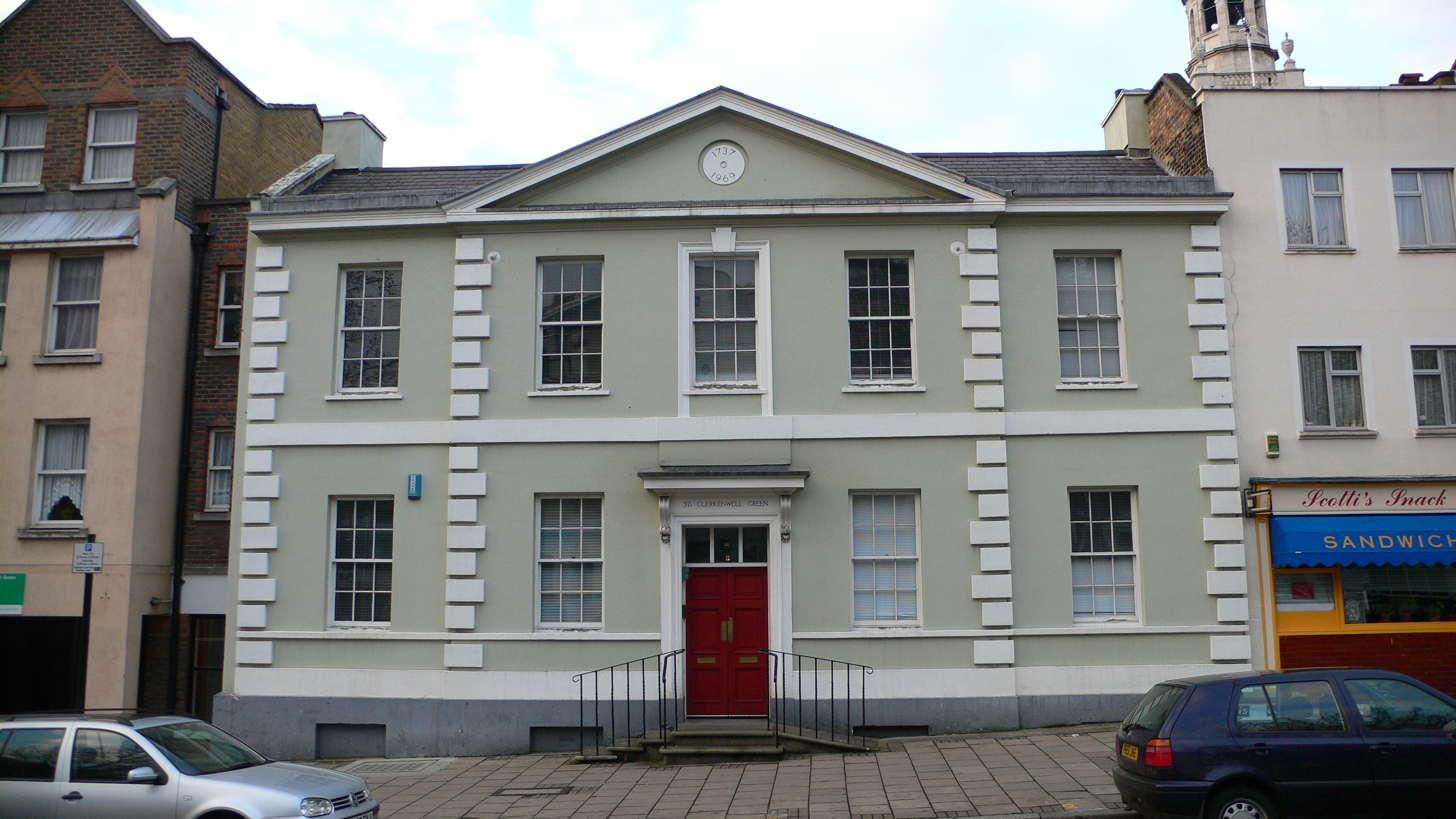
The Welsh Charity School on Clerkenwell Green (now the Marx Memorial Library)

The society was launched on Saint David's Day 1715 with prayers and a Welsh sermon at St Paul's church, Covent Garden. Its principal philanthropic endeavour was the British Charity School, established in 1716 to assist impoverished Welsh children in London. The school flourished, and in 1738 acquired its own purpose-built premises on Clerkenwell Green. The main channel by which the Society raised funds for the school was the annual Saint David's Day sermon and associated dinner.

== Decline ==
From the middle years of the 18th century the Society became somewhat lethargic, and it was joined in administering and supporting the school by the Honourable Society of Cymmrodorion (founded in 1751 with the express aim, at least in part, of lending assistance to the Antient Britons). The Saint David's Day dinner continued to be held nominally under the auspices of the Antient Britons, but with the support of the Cymmrodorion. In practice, there was considerable overlap in the membership and officers of the two societies. The Cymmrodorion lapsed into abeyance in 1787; and the Antient Britons, as an independent society, also appears to have faded away by the end of the 18th century, although the school survived for another two centuries.

== Bibliography ==
- Jenkins, R. T.; Ramage, Helen M. (1951). A History of the Honourable Society of Cymmrodorion and of the Gwyneddigion and Cymreigyddion Societies (1751–1951). Y Cymmrodor. Vol. 50. London: Honourable Society of Cymmrodorion. pp. 12–15.
- Kaminski-Jones, Rhys (2017). "'Where Cymry united, delighted appear': the Society of Ancient Britons and the celebration of St David's Day in London, 1715–1815". Transactions of the Honourable Society of Cymmrodorion. n.s. 23: 56–68.
- Jones, Emrys, ed. (2001). The Welsh in London, 1500–2000. Cardiff: University of Wales Press. pp. 62–3. ISBN 0708317103.
