= Baron Roberts =

The title Baron Roberts has been held by three people:

- Frederick Roberts, 1st Earl Roberts (1832–1914), British general, created Baron Roberts of Kandahar in 1892
- Wyn Roberts, Baron Roberts of Conwy (b. 1930), Welsh Conservative politician
- Roger Roberts, Baron Roberts of Llandudno (b. 1935), Welsh Liberal Democrat politician
