= Maldwyn Thomas =

Welsh businessman and Liberal Party politician

Sir John Maldwyn Thomas (17 June 1918 – 31 July 2002) was a Welsh businessman and Liberal Party politician.

== Background ==
Maldwyn Thomas was the son of Daniel and Gwladys Thomas. He was educated at Porth Rhondda Grammar School. In 1975, he married Maureen Elizabeth Thomas. In 1984 he was knighted. In 1999 his wife Maureen received the DBE.

== Professional career ==
Thomas was a Fellow of the Chartered Institute of Secretaries, he took first place in South Wales in both his intermediate and final examinations. He was secretary to Lewis & Tylor Ltd, a large industrial concern in Cardiff, from 1940-56. In 1953 he was Called to Bar at Gray's Inn. He worked for Rank Xerox from 1964-1979, as Secretary, Managing Director and finally as Chairman.

== Political career ==
Thomas was Liberal candidate for the Aberavon division of Glamorgan at the 1950 General Election. It was not a promising seat for the Liberals who had not run a candidate since 1931. He came a third;

General Election 1950: Aberavon
Party	Candidate	Votes	%	±%
Labour	William George Cove	29,278	68.7	−3.8
National Liberal	Auberon M H Y M Herbert	8,091	19.0	−8.5
Liberal	John Maldwyn Thomas	5,263	12.4	N/A
Majority		21,187	49.7	+4.7
Turnout		42,634	85.8	+6.4
Labour hold		Swing		

He did not stand for parliament again. He served as President of the Welsh Liberal Party from 1985–86. He was President of the London Welsh Association and Trust from 1994-2001. He was a Trustee of the London Welsh School.

Party political offices
Preceded by Emlyn Hooson	President of the Welsh Liberal Party; 1985–1986	Succeeded by Gruffydd Evans
