= St David's School, Middlesex =

St David's School
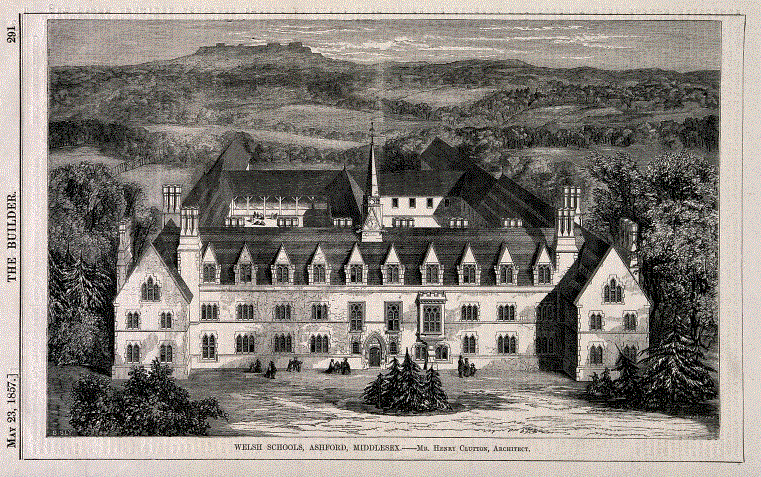
- The Ashford school shortly after opening in 1857

Location
- Church Road; Ashford, Surrey, TW15 3DZ; England; 51°26′19″N 0°28′06″W

Information
- Established: 1716
- Closed: 2009
- Local authority: Surrey

St David's School was an independent girls' school in Ashford (historically in Middlesex, but from 1965 in the district of Spelthorne in Surrey), England. The school was originally established in London in 1716 as the British Charity School or Welsh Charity School. It was located in a purpose-built home on Clerkenwell Green from 1738, before moving to Gray's Inn Road in 1772, and eventually to Ashford in 1857. It was at first a boys' school, and then from 1758 co-educational, but from 1882 it began to admit girls only and became known as the Welsh Girls' School. It changed its name to St David's School in 1967, and closed in 2009.

== History ==
=== Patronage ===
The school's patron was Queen Elizabeth II.

=== London ===
The school was originally established by the Honourable and Loyal Society of Antient Britons (founded 1715), a London-based Welsh society, as a charitable institution to assist impoverished Welsh children in London. In the later 18th century it was also supported by the Honourable Society of Cymmrodorion (founded 1751), another London Welsh society.

The school opened informally (with 10 boys and a master) in 1716 in a house in Sheer Lane, London (probably located near Temple Bar), and was more formally instituted in 1718. In 1719 it moved into one of the buildings of Ailesbury Chapel, Clerkenwell, the former chapel of the medieval Clerkenwell Priory, but at this date in use as a Presbyterian meeting-house. The chapel was reconstructed as an Anglican parish church (St John Clerkenwell) in 1721–3, when the school appears to have moved to nearby Jerusalem Passage. The numbers of pupils fluctuated through this period, though there were at times up to 50 boys.

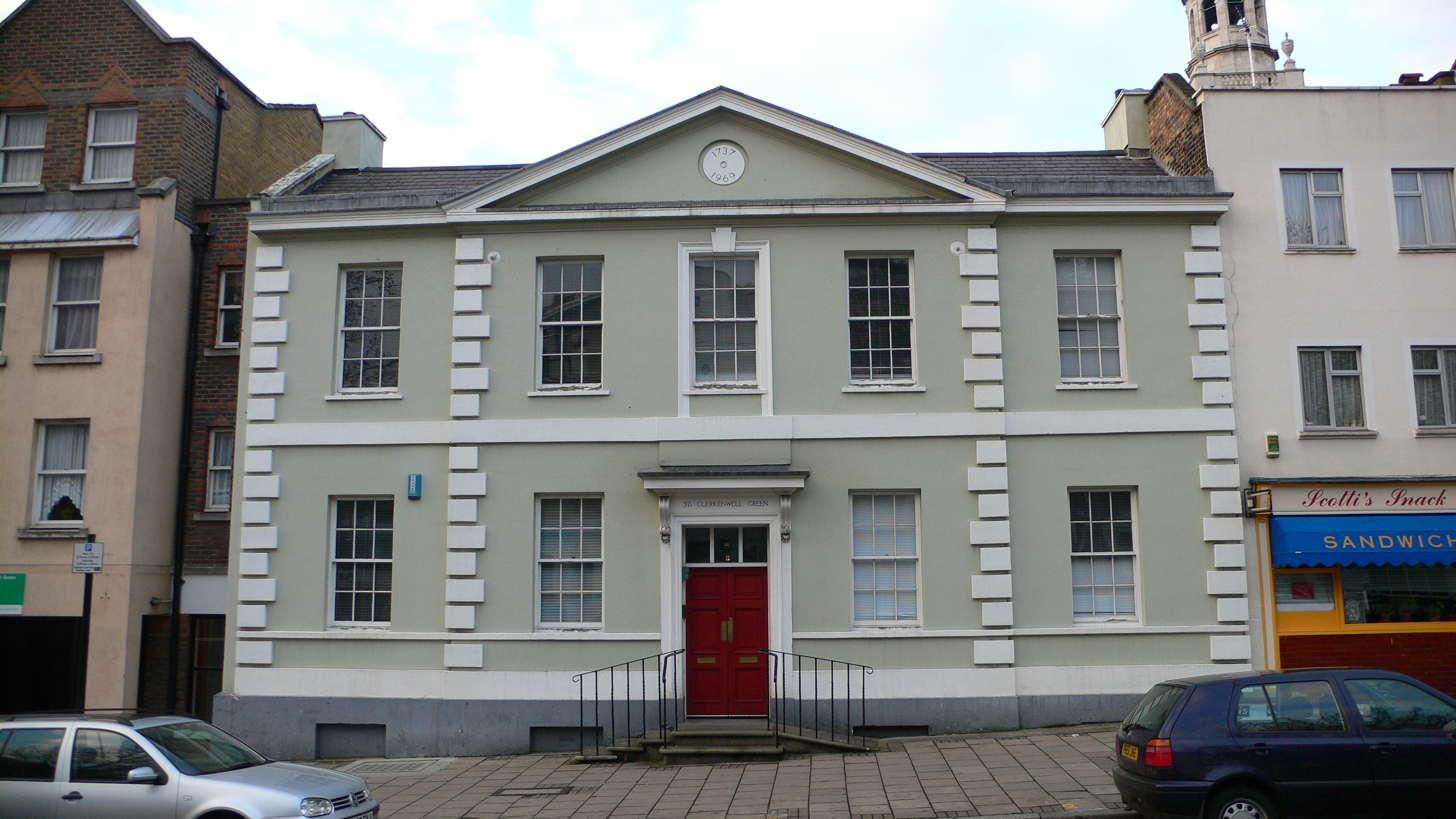
The Welsh Charity School on Clerkenwell Green, occupied 1738–1772. The building is now the Marx Memorial Library.

In 1738 the school moved into a new purpose-built home on Clerkenwell Green. The construction of this building, designed by James Steer, was funded by subscriptions. The building (greatly altered and restored) survives, and is now the Marx Memorial Library.

The first girls were admitted to the school in 1758. In 1768, a decision was taken to admit a small number of residential pupils: the first were six girls.

Thomas Pennant's British Zoology (1766) was published "under the auspices of the Cymmrodorion Society", and "sold for the benefit of the British Charity-School on Clerkenwell Green". Pennant in fact lost heavily on the publication, and so the school derived no direct benefit from it. Independently of this work, however, he did give the school a donation of £100.

Conditions at Clerkenwell Green became increasingly cramped, and in 1772 the school moved into a new building in Gray's Inn Lane (now Gray's Inn Road). (Coincidentally, the site was almost exactly opposite that on which the London Welsh Centre would open in 1930.) The school now became predominantly residential.

=== Ashford ===
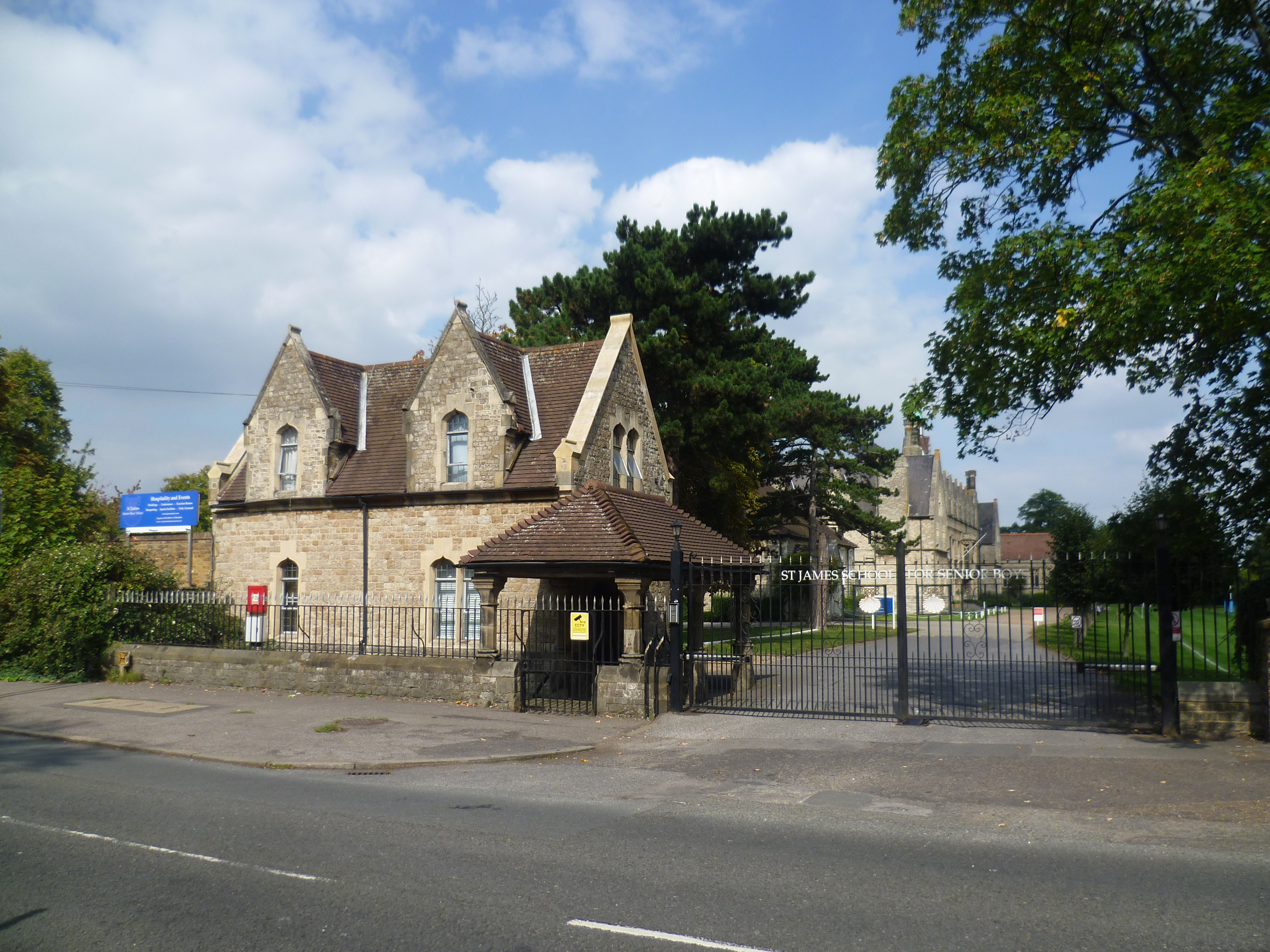
Entrance to the Ashford site, now occupied by St James Senior Boys' School

In 1857 the school moved out of London to a new site at Ashford, Middlesex. It began to have difficulty attracting charitable pupils, and in 1882 was reconstituted to admit a higher proportion of fee-paying pupils, and as a school exclusively for girls (although those boys already admitted were able to stay for the remainder of their education). It now became known as the Welsh Girls' School.

During World War II the school was evacuated to the Powis Castle estate in Montgomeryshire, but returned to its Ashford site in 1946. In the post-war period its connections with Wales became more tenuous, and in 1967 the name was changed to St David's School. The school closed in 2009 because of falling numbers caused by the financial crisis. In 2010, the Ashford buildings were taken over by St James Independent Schools and opened as St James Senior Boys' School.

== See also ==
- London Welsh School
