= Alex Carlile, Baron Carlile of Berriew =

British barrister and politician (born 1948)

The Right Honourable The Lord Carlile of Berriew CBE KC
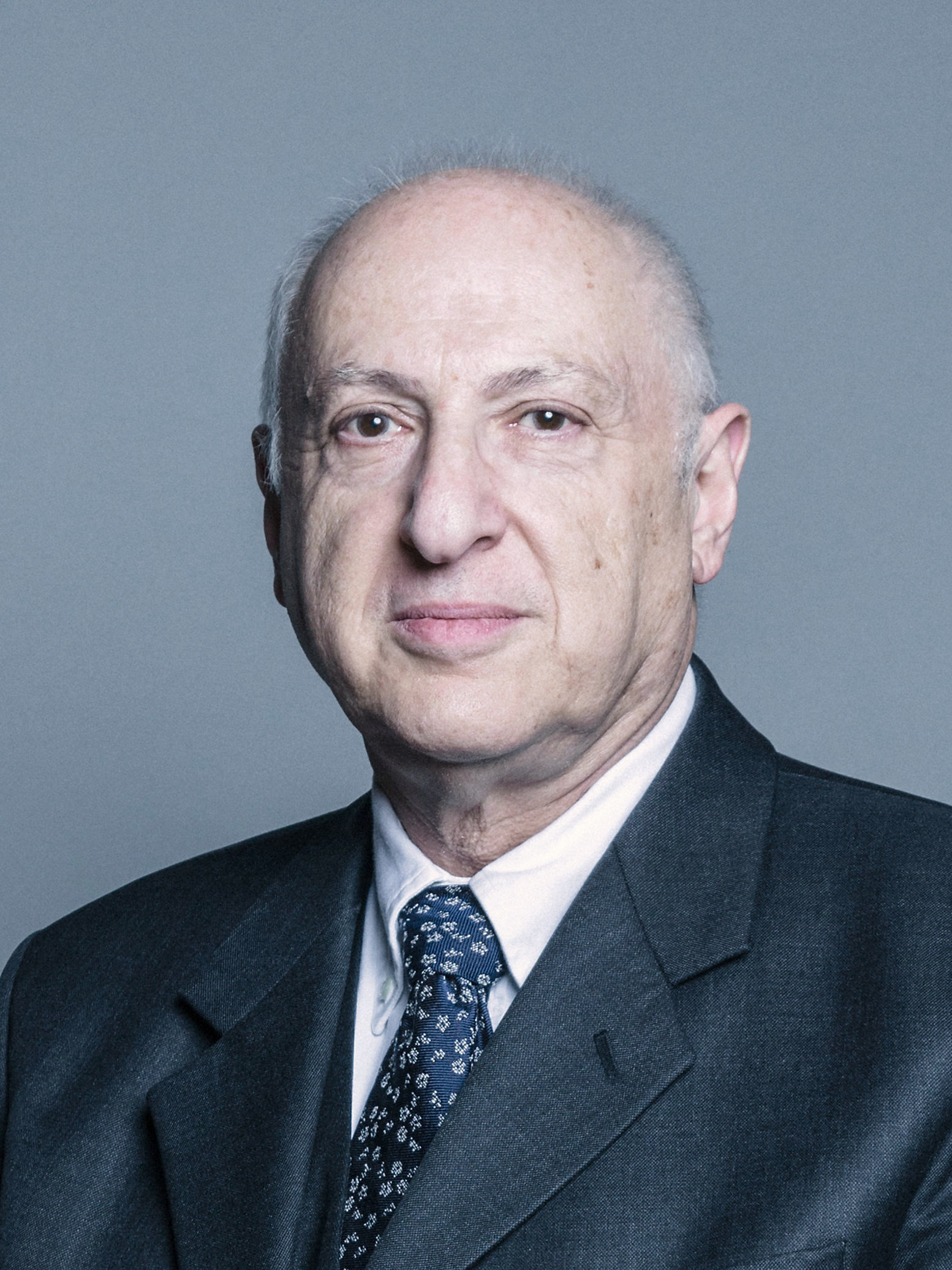

Member of the House of Lords
- Lord Temporal
- Life peerage 27 July 1999

Member of Parliament for Montgomeryshire
- In office 9 June 1983 – 8 April 1997
- Preceded by: Delwyn Williams
- Succeeded by: Lembit Öpik

Personal details
- Born: Alexander Charles Carlile; 12 February 1948 (age 78) Ruabon, Wrexham, Wales
- Citizenship: United Kingdom
- Party: Crossbench (since 2017)
- Other political affiliations: Liberal (before 1988); Liberal Democrats (1988–2017)
- Spouse: Alison Levitt (m. 2007)
- Children: 3 children, 2 stepchildren
- Education: King's College London
- Profession: Barrister and Consultant

Alexander Charles Carlile, Baron Carlile of Berriew, CBE, KC, FRSA (born 12 February 1948) is a British barrister and crossbench member of the House of Lords. He was the Member of Parliament (MP) for Montgomeryshire from 1983 to 1997 under the banner of the Liberal Party and then Liberal Democrat.

== Early life and career at the bar ==
Alex Carlile, the son of Polish Jewish immigrants, was born in Ruabon, Wrexham, Wales and brought up in Lancashire. He was educated at Epsom College and at King's College London where he graduated in law in 1969. He was called to the Bar by Gray's Inn in 1970 and became a Queen's Counsel (QC) at the early age of 36.

Lord Carlile of Berriew is a company director and barrister, and former Head of Chambers of Foundry Chambers, London, a set of barristers' chambers. He defended Diana, Princess of Wales's butler, Paul Burrell, against charges that Burrell had stolen some of her estate's belongings. Carlile stood down as head of chambers at 9–12 Bell Yard in 2007.

== Career in public life ==
=== As MP ===
Carlile stood unsuccessfully as a Liberal for East Flintshire at the general elections of February and October 1974. At the 1983 election, standing as a Liberal Democrat, he became the Member of Parliament for Montgomeryshire and held the seat until 1997; he also became the leader of his party in Wales.

Carlile was the first Member of Parliament to campaign for the rights of transgender people.

=== As peer ===
On 27 July 1999, he was created a life peer as Baron Carlile of Berriew, of Berriew in the County of Powys.

Carlile sat as a Liberal Democrat peer until 2016, when he left the party, stating that he found himself "at odds" with its policies on many matters, including national security issues. It was reported that civil liberties, especially the Investigatory Powers Act 2016, were at the core of the disagreement.

In 2001 he was appointed the independent reviewer of terrorism legislation. He continued the role until 2011. Lord Carlile acted from 2001 to 2011 as the UK's Independent Reviewer of Terrorism Legislation. He was succeeded by David Anderson QC. The Director of Liberty, Shami Chakrabarti, called Carlile's support for control orders "disappointing" in a February 2006 press release condemning the introduction of control orders by the Prevention of Terrorism Act 2005.

From 2001 to 2016 Carlile sat as a deputy judge in the High Court of Justice.

Carlile was appointed Commander of the Order of the British Empire (CBE) in the 2012 New Year Honours for services to national security law.

In 2014 Carlile mounted a legal challenge to the UK travel ban on Maryam Rajavi, leader of the People's Mujahedin of Iran (MeK) and president-elect of the National Council of Resistance of Iran. The Supreme Court decided in favour of the UK government.

In 2015, he joined with a cross-party group of peers to reintroduce the Draft Communications Data Bill, known by its opponents as the "Snoopers' Charter".

Carlile was an independent reviewer on the 2015 Assessment on Paramilitary Groups in Northern Ireland.

He was vocal in his opposition to the UK coalition government's Legal Aid, Sentencing and Punishment of Offenders Bill, proposing many amendments. He was one of five Lords who vehemently opposed the introduction of means testing for police advice (to cover the cost of lawyers consulting suspects in police stations). "A single moment of reflection leaves one open-mouthed at the absurdity of this proposal", he said.

In 2016 Carlile sat on the founding committee of National Opposition to Windfarms, and sponsored the launch event at the Houses of Parliament.

In 2019 Carlile was initially appointed to lead the independent review of the UK government's Prevent programme but resigned after a legal challenge was mounted by Rights Watch UK against his appointment; the petitioner felt strongly that his statements in favour of the strategy would unduly bias his report. The strategy had "become a toxic brand for many within Muslim communities, with some viewing it as a state tool for spying on them."

In 2020 Carlile was listed as a bencher on the Competition Appeal Tribunal, where he sat between 2005 and 2013 as part-time Chair.

=== Awards and co-curriculars ===
Carlile is an Honorary Professor in the Universities of St Andrews and Swansea, and a Fellow of King's College London. He is an Honorary Doctor of Laws in the Universities of Swansea, South Wales, Chester, Manchester Metropolitan, and the Hungarian Institute of Criminology.

Carlile is a co-director and co-owner of a strategy and political risks consultancy, SC Strategy Limited with Sir John Scarlett, the former chief of MI6 and William Jessett CBE (former Director of Strategy at UK Ministry of Defence.

According to the Register of Lords' Interests, Lord Carlile of Berriew was at various times a director of 5 Bell Yard Ltd and the Wynnstay Group of agricultural feed manufacturers, agricultural goods merchants and fuel oil distributors. He was president of the Howard League for Penal Reform in 2006–9.

== Penal reform ==
From 2006 to 2013, Carlile was President of the Howard League for Penal Reform.

In 2006 he was chairman of the Carlile Inquiry into the use of force on children in custody. In 2011, Lord Carlile held a follow-up hearing in the House of Lords. He put together an expert panel who gave both written and oral evidence.

== Personal life ==
He lists his recreations as politics, theatre, food and football, and is a member of the Athenaeum Club. He is a lifelong supporter of English football club Burnley FC. He is a Fellow of the Royal Society of Arts, Patron of The Security Institute, and Patron (previously Chairman) of the Chartered Security Professionals Registration Authority.

He has three children by his first wife Frances and nine grandchildren. He married his second wife, Alison Levitt KC, in December 2007. She was herself a barrister, until her appointment as a Circuit Judge. She was created a life peer as Baroness Levitt in 2025.

Carlile is a Bencher of Gray's Inn.

On 11 July 2018, Carlile (after being granted a visa) was refused entry to India at Indira Gandhi International Airport where he was due to address a press conference in defence of jailed Bangladeshi politician Khaleda Zia and meet a human rights body. India's foreign ministry said his "intended activity in India was incompatible with the purpose of his visit as mentioned in his visa application", though media reported the decision to refuse him entry was a political one to protect India–Bangladesh relations.

== See also ==
- Timeline of children's rights in the United Kingdom

Parliament of the United Kingdom
Preceded by Delwyn Williams	Member of Parliament for Montgomeryshire; 1983–1997	Succeeded by Lembit Öpik
Party political offices
Preceded by ?	Chairman of the Welsh Liberal Party; 1980–1982	Succeeded by Winston Roddick
Preceded by Richard Livsey	Leader of the Welsh Liberal Democrats; 1992–1997	Succeeded by Richard Livsey
Preceded by Martin Thomas	President of the Welsh Liberal Democrats; 1997–1999	Succeeded by ?
Orders of precedence in the United Kingdom
Preceded by The Lord Grabiner	Gentlemen; Baron Carlile of Berriew	Followed by The Lord Oxburgh
