= 1962 Montgomeryshire by-election =

1962 UK parliamentary by-election

The 1962 Montgomeryshire by-election was a parliamentary by-election held on 15 May 1962 for the British House of Commons constituency of Montgomeryshire.

== Previous MP ==
The seat had become vacant when, the constituency's Member of Parliament (MP), the Rt Hon. (Edward) Clement Davies died

Clement Davies (19 February 1884 – 23 March 1962) had been Montgomeryshire's MP since the 1929 general election. He had been a Liberal Party member from 1929–1931, a Liberal National MP from 1931 until 1939, then an Independent Liberal member until he rejoined the Liberal Party in August 1942. Davies was the Liberal Party leader from 1945 until 1956.

== Candidates ==
Four candidates were nominated. The list below is set out in descending order of the number of votes received at the by-election.

1. The Liberal Party candidate, was (Hugh) Emlyn Hooson. He was a barrister, born 26 March 1925. Hooson had contested the seat of Conway at the general elections in 1950 and 1951

Hooson won the by-election, in a seat which had been represented by some sort of Liberal continuously since 1880. He retained the seat until he was defeated in the 1979 United Kingdom general election. Hooson was a candidate for the Liberal leadership in 1967. In 1979 he was given a Life Peerage as Baron Hooson.

2. The Conservative candidate was Robert H. Dawson. This was the only Parliamentary election he contested.

3. Representing the Labour Party was Tudor Davies, who also contested no other Parliamentary election.

4. The Rev. Islwyn Ffowc Elis stood for Plaid Cymru, the Welsh nationalist party, which in 1962 had never won a Parliamentary election. He contested the seat for a second time in the 1964 United Kingdom general election.

== Result ==
1962 Montgomeryshire by-election
Party	Candidate	Votes	%	±%
Liberal	Emlyn Hooson	13,181	51.3	+9.3
Conservative	Robert H. Dawson	5,632	21.9	−9.4
Labour	Tudor Davies	5,299	20.6	−6.0
Plaid Cymru	Islwyn Ffowc Elis	1,594	6.2	N/A
Majority		7,549	29.4	+18.7
Turnout		25,706	85.1	+1.3
Registered electors		30,202		
Liberal hold		Swing	+9.4	

== See also ==
- Montgomeryshire constituency
- List of United Kingdom by-elections
- United Kingdom by-election records
