= Martin Thomas, Baron Thomas of Gresford =

British politician (born 1937)

The Right Honourable The Lord Thomas of Gresford OBE KC
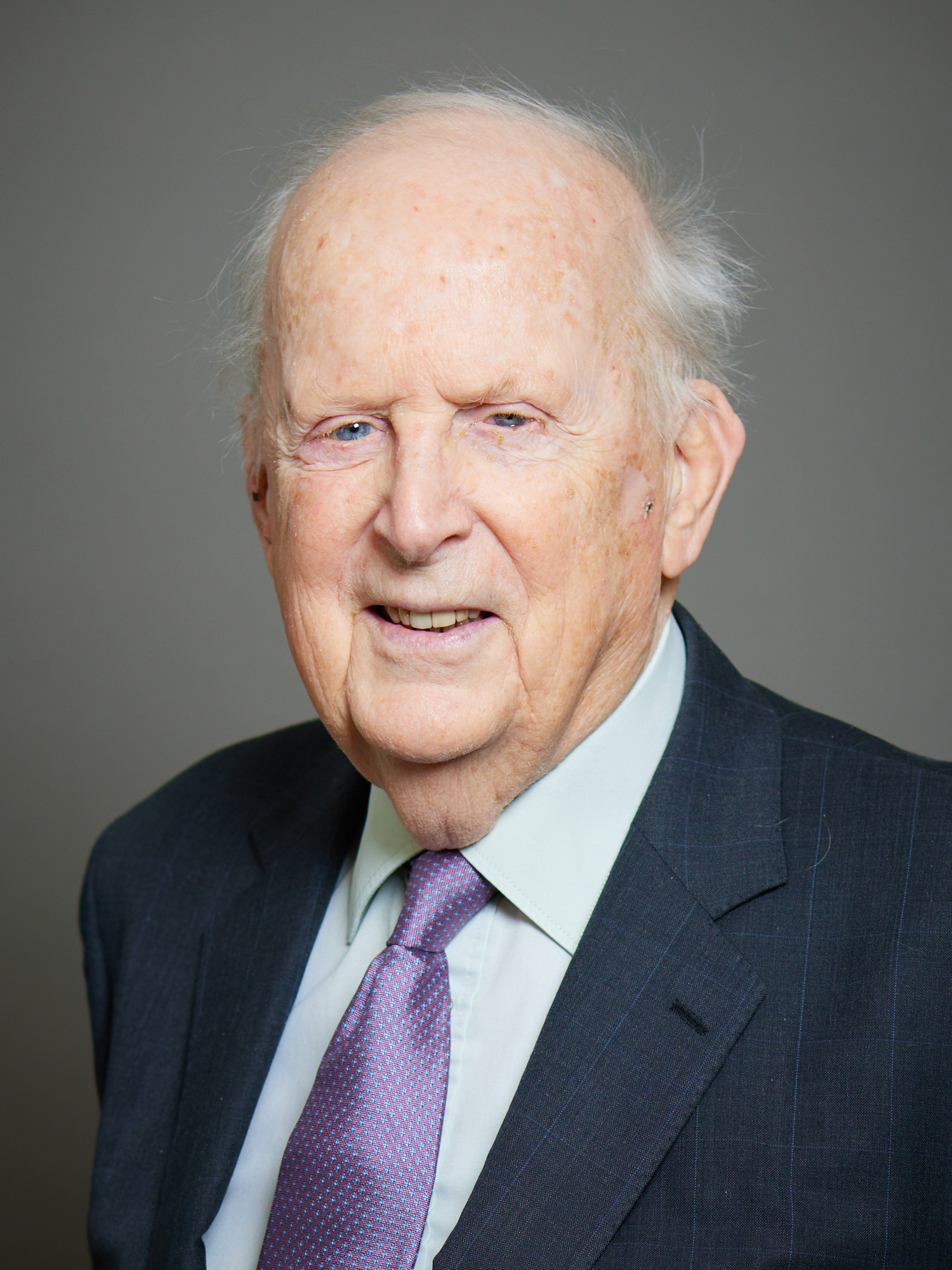

Member of the House of Lords
- Lord Temporal
- Life peerage 30 September 1996

Personal details
- Born: 13 March 1937 (age 89) Wrexham
- Party: Liberal Democrats
- Spouse(s): Nan Kerr (m. 1961 – her death 2000); Baroness Walmsley (m. 2005)
- Education: Peterhouse, Cambridge University
- Profession: Solicitor, Barrister, Judge, Lecturer

Donald Martin Thomas, Baron Thomas of Gresford, OBE, KC (born 13 March 1937) is a British Liberal Democrat politician.

Born the son of a Llangollen policeman, he was educated at Grove Park Grammar School, Wrexham, and at Peterhouse, Cambridge, he graduated with a degree of LLB and an MA in Classics. He practised as a solicitor in Wrexham from 1961 to 1966 before becoming a lecturer in law. He was called to the bar at Gray's Inn in 1967, and was appointed QC in 1979. He became a Crown Court Recorder in 1976, and was authorised to sit as a deputy High Court judge in 1995.

Having been appointed an Officer of the Order of the British Empire (OBE) in the 1982 Birthday Honours, Thomas was created a Life Peer as Baron Thomas of Gresford, of Gresford in the County Borough of Wrexham on 30 September 1996, whereupon he took the Liberal Democrat Whip. Since then he has been a spokesman on Wales and Home Affairs, and has sat on a number of committees. His political interests include Hong Kong, China, criminal justice, and Wales.

In 1961 Thomas married Nan Kerr, with whom he had three sons and one daughter. She died in 2000. In 2005, he married fellow Liberal Democrat peer Baroness Walmsley.

Lord Thomas was a vice-president of the Lloyd George Society until February 2012, when he was elected president.

Lord Thomas is the honorary chairman of the Association of Military Court Advocates.

Lord Thomas is the honorary president of the Hong Kong Welsh Male Voice Choir

Party political offices
Preceded by Mary Murphy	Chairman of the Welsh Liberal Party; 1969–1973	Succeeded by Geraint Howells
Preceded by Geraint Howells	President of the Welsh Liberal Party; 1977–1979	Succeeded by Roger Roberts
Preceded by Roger Roberts	President of the Welsh Liberal Democrats; 1993–1996	Succeeded by Alex Carlile
Orders of precedence in the United Kingdom
Preceded by The Lord Bowness	Gentlemen; Baron Thomas of Gresford	Followed by The Lord Currie of Marylebone
