= Clement Davies =

British Liberal politician (1884–1962)

The Right Honourable Clement Davies QC
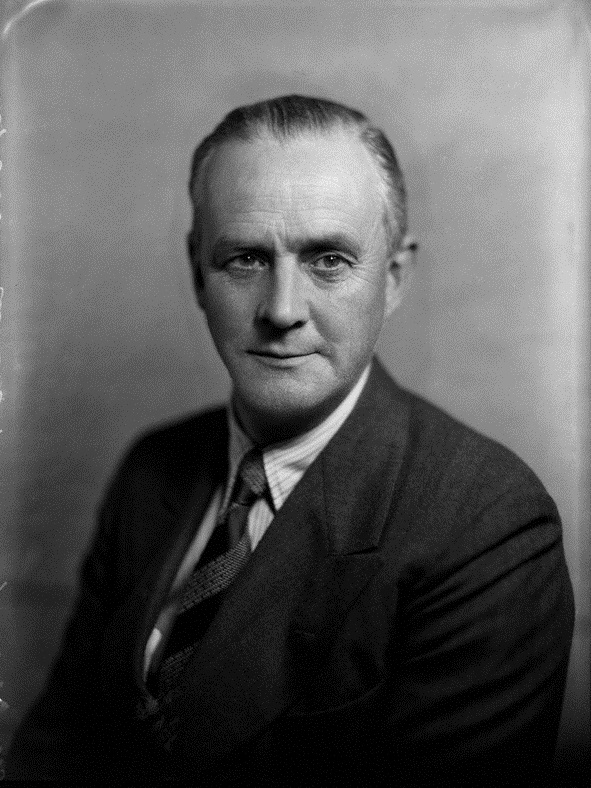
- Davies in 1936

Leader of the Liberal Party
- In office 2 August 1945 – 5 November 1956
- Deputy: Megan Lloyd George (1949–1951)
- Preceded by: Archibald Sinclair
- Succeeded by: Jo Grimond

Member of Parliament for Montgomeryshire
- In office 30 May 1929 – 23 March 1962
- Preceded by: David Davies
- Succeeded by: Emlyn Hooson

Personal details
- Born: 19 February 1884 Llanfyllin, Wales
- Died: 23 March 1962 (aged 78) Montgomery, Wales
- Education: Trinity Hall, Cambridge

Edward Clement Davies QC (19 February 1884 – 23 March 1962) was a Welsh politician and leader of the Liberal Party from 1945 to 1956.

== Early life and education ==
Edward Clement Davies was born on 19 February 1884 in Llanfyllin, Montgomeryshire, Wales. He was educated at the local primary school and at Llanfyllin County School, to which he won a scholarship in 1897. He read law at Trinity Hall, Cambridge, where he graduated with first-class honours.

== Legal practice ==
Davies lectured in law at the University College of Wales, Aberystwyth, in 1908–1909 and was called to the bar at Lincoln's Inn. He practiced as a barrister in North Wales and in northern England before moving to London in 1910, where he established a successful legal practice. During the First World War he worked for the Board of Trade. He took silk in 1926, becoming a KC.

== Early political career ==
Davies was elected to the House of Commons in the 1929 General Election as a Liberal Member of Parliament (MP) for Montgomeryshire. From 1929 until 1931 he supported David Lloyd George's leadership of the party. In 1931, the Liberals divided into three groups and he became one of the Liberal National MPs supporting the National Government. He came under increasing pressure from his local Liberal executive and also his predecessor as MP Lord Davies who was President of Montgomeryshire Liberal Association, to move into opposition. In 1939 he resigned from both the Liberal Nationals and the National Government whip. In 1940, he was chairman of the All Party Action Group that played a significant role in forcing the resignation of the Prime Minister, Neville Chamberlain.

== Leader of the Liberal Party ==
In 1942, he rejoined the Liberal Party, becoming a prominent figure in the Radical Action group, which called for the party to withdraw from the war-time electoral pact and adopt more radical policies. Indeed, at his adoption meeting in June 1945 he declared that "Members of the Labour Party and myself can walk side by side for a long way. There are many things on which we can agree." Despite the fact that he had been absent from the party for a decade, with lingering suspicions that his commitment to Liberalism was less than full, he became leader of the Liberal Party in 1945 after Archibald Sinclair surprisingly lost his seat in the electoral debacle of that year that reduced the Liberals to just 12 seats in the House of Commons.

Davies had not sought the position of leader and was not enthusiastic about it. However, with only 12 MPs, six of whom were only newly elected that year, the party's choice was somewhat limited. It was widely expected and generally hoped (probably even by Davies himself), that he would be only a 'caretaker' leader until the more dynamic and popular Sinclair could get back into the House of Commons. Since that never happened, Davies, was in fact to remain party leader for the next 11 years, taking the Liberals through three general elections.

Davies was President of the London Welsh Trust, which runs the London Welsh Centre, Gray's Inn Road, from 1946 until 1947. He was made a Privy Councillor in 1947.

His first general election as party leader, in 1950, reduced the party to nine MPs with barely 9% of the vote. In those of 1951 and 1955, the Liberals fell back even further, holding only six seats, with 2.5% and 2.7% of the vote respectively (although these vote shares were largely attributed to the huge drop in the number of seats the party fought). He finally resigned as leader at the party conference in September 1956 and was succeeded by the much younger and more vigorous Jo Grimond, following what was effectively a coup by the membership against the executive; both Davies and Grimond appeared to be unaware of the coup until it was over.

Davies therefore led the Liberal Party, which, in the late 19th and early 20th century had been a major force in British politics and a frequent party of government, through its lowest period, when it was reduced to a minor party: the result of the electorate's polarisation between the Labour and the Conservatives. The cliché "A Liberal vote is a wasted vote" argument never held truer than in the 1950s. He was personally well-liked, both in the party and beyond it. The general view of him was that of a personally decent man who did his best in a position to which neither taste nor temperament fitted him.

Davies was an alcoholic for decades, which left him in a weakened state of health, particularly by the time he took on the burden of party leadership. For two of his three general election campaigns as leader, for example, he was hospitalised. Also, despite the general affection in which he was held, his leadership was widely regarded as lacklustre and ineffective, thus contributing to the party's malaise at a time when it was most in need of direction.

In recent years, however, his role has been revised and treated more sympathetically. Historians now point out that with the Cold War tensions of the late 1940s and early 1950s in particular, leading the Liberal Party then would have been a challenge for anybody, and just by keeping the party together and in existence at all, Davies made a significant contribution. It has also emerged that he was offered cabinet office (Education Minister) in 1951 by Prime Minister Winston Churchill in exchange for supporting the new Conservative government but refused on the grounds that it would have destroyed the Liberal Party.

Clement Davies died in 1962, at the age of 78. Though still an MP, he was by then largely detached from the affairs of the Liberal party and acted semi-independently. He was succeeded as Liberal MP for Montgomeryshire by Emlyn Hooson.

== Personal life ==
In 1913, Clement married Jano Elizabeth Davies, a senior mistress at the Edmonton Latymer School. Numerous personal tragedies darkened his life. He lost three of his four children within the space of a few years after the outbreak of the Second World War. His oldest son, David, died in 1939 as a result of natural causes related to epilepsy, and his daughter Mary (a servicewoman with the ATS) committed suicide in 1941 and another son, Geraint, was killed on active service in the Welsh Guards in 1942. Each of his children died at the age of 24, except for Davies's fourth child, Stanley, who survived until old age.

== Arms ==
Coat of arms of Clement Davies
| Motto Sylfaen Heddwych Yw Cyfraith A Chyfiawnder (The Foundation of Peace Is Law And Justice) |

== Sources ==
=== Books and journals ===
- Violet Bonham Carter, ed. Mark Pottle, Daring to Hope: Diaries 1945–1969 (Weidenfeld & Nicolson, 2000)
- Hooson, Emlyn (1998). "Clement Davies: An Underestimated Welshman and Politician" (PDF). Transactions of the Honourable Society of Cymmrodorion. New Series. 4: 168–186.
- Jones, J. Graham (June 1993). "The Liberal Party and Wales, 1945–79" (PDF). Welsh History Review. 16 (3): 326–355.
- Alun Wyburn-Powell, Clement Davies: Liberal Leader (Politico's, 2003) ISBN 1-902301-97-8
- Dutton, David (2008). Liberals in Schism – A History of the National Liberal Party. I. B. Tauris & Co Ltd. p. 118. doi:10.5040/9780755621118. ISBN 978-1845116675.

Parliament of the United Kingdom
| Preceded by David Davies | Member of Parliament for Montgomeryshire; 1929 – 1962 | Succeeded by Emlyn Hooson |
Party political offices
| Preceded by Sir Archibald Sinclair | Leader of the Liberal Party; 1945–1956 | Succeeded by Jo Grimond |
| Preceded by David Lloyd George? | President of the Welsh Liberal Federation; 1945–1948 | Succeeded by Roderic Bowen |
