= Joan Walmsley, Baroness Walmsley =

British politician

The Right Honourable The Baroness Walmsley
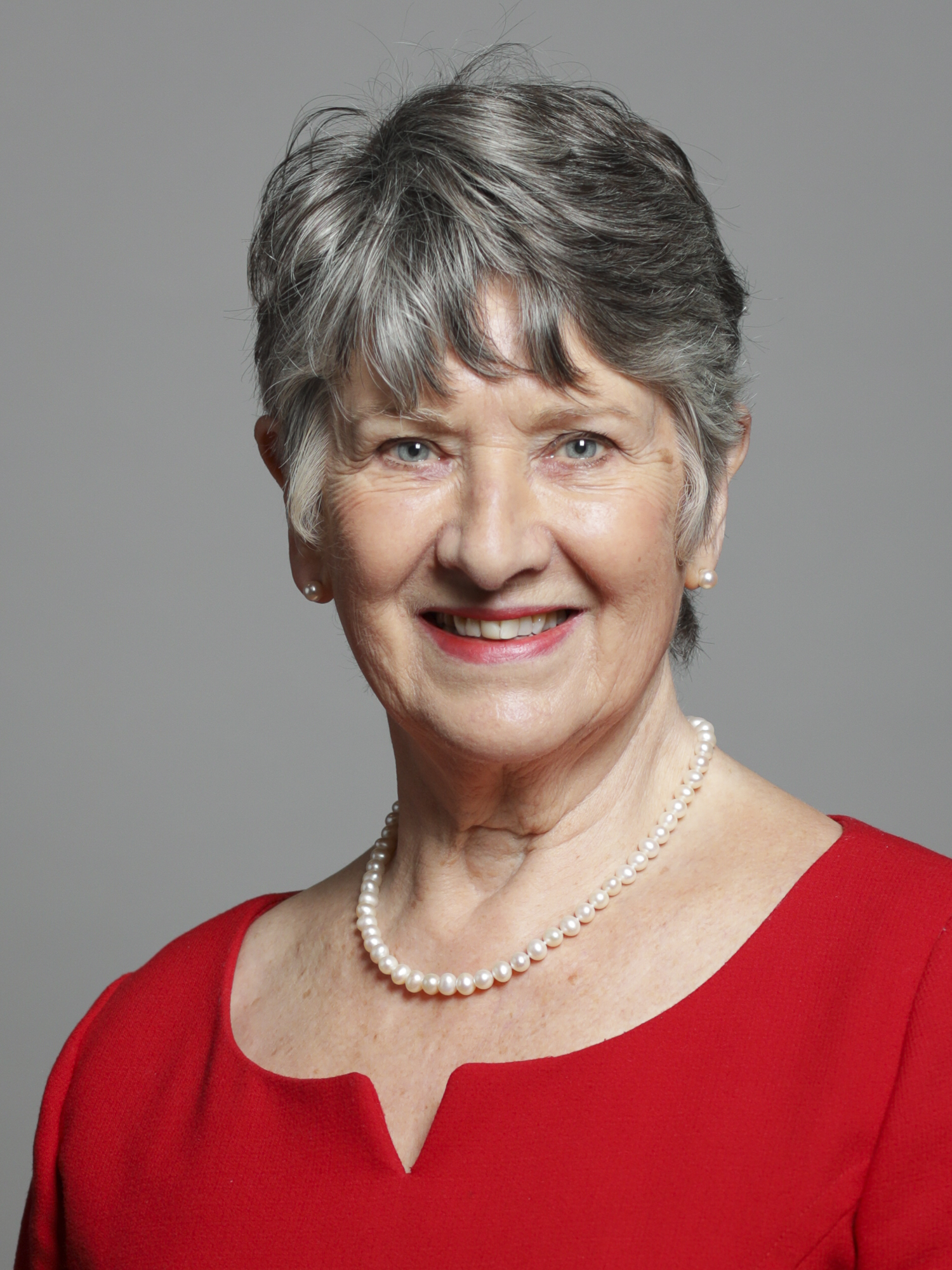

Co-Deputy Leader of the Liberal Democrats in the House of Lords
- In office 1 October 2017 – 7 October 2024 Serving with The Lord Dholakia
- Leader: The Lord Newby

Member of the House of Lords
- Lord Temporal
- Life peerage 15 May 2000

Personal details
- Born: 12 April 1943 (age 83) West Derby, Liverpool
- Party: Liberal Democrats
- Spouse(s): (1) John Richardson (divorced) (2) Christopher Walmsley (died) (3) Lord Thomas of Gresford
- Children: Adrian and Sarah

Joan Margaret Walmsley, Baroness Walmsley (born 12 April 1943) is a British Liberal Democrat politician. She was co-deputy leader of the Liberal Democrats in the House of Lords between 2017 and 2024.

== Biography ==
She was educated at Notre Dame High School in Liverpool, before attending Liverpool University from where she graduated with a BSc in Biology in 1966, and later completed a PGCE at Manchester Polytechnic in 1979. She worked as a cytologist at the Christie Hospital in Manchester from 1965 to 1967 and taught at Buxton College from 1979 to 1986. She went into public relations and worked for Hill & Knowlton until 1996, then began her own PR consultancy which she closed in 2003.

In the 1992 general election she stood as the Liberal Democrat candidate in Morley & Leeds South, and Congleton in 1997 general election, but was defeated on both occasions.

She was created a life peer on 15 May 2000 taking the title Baroness Walmsley, of West Derby in the County of Merseyside, whereupon she took the Liberal Democrat Whip. She was the party's spokesperson in the House of Lords on: Education & Skills (2001–2003); Home Affairs (2003–2004); and again for Education & Skills from 2004 onwards. A member of the Science & Technology Select committee 2000–2005, and then Chair of the Science & Technology Sub-Committee in 2002 which produced the report on taxonomy entitled "What on Earth? The threat to the science underpinning conservation".

Lady Walmsley was formerly president of Women Liberal Democrats and the Campaign for Gender Balance, and has been a member of most of the Party's major committees. She lists her political interests as child protection, young offenders and prison education, the environment and renewable energy. She is Vice Chair of the All Party Parliamentary Group for Children.

She is active in charity work relating to children and the environment. Her principal charities are: Botanic Gardens Conservation International (chairman); UNICEF UK (board member); NSPCC (parliamentary ambassador); SKVC Children's Trust, a charity for street children in India (Patron).

Walmsley (née Watson) married John Richardson in 1966 (divorced 1980) with whom she has two children. In 1986 she married Christopher Walmsley (who died in 1995) being stepmother to his son and two daughters. In 2005, she married Lord Thomas of Gresford, a fellow Liberal Democrat peer, KC and then Shadow Attorney General. She and her husband are one of the few couples to both hold titles in their own right.

She is a member of the Parliamentary Choir and was its chairman from 2004 to 2006.
