= Delwyn Williams =

British Conservative politician (1938–2024)

- Delwyn Williams outside Welshpool Town Hall following his election victory, May 1979

Member of Parliament for Montgomeryshire
- In office 3 May 1979 – 13 May 1983
- Preceded by: Emlyn Hooson
- Succeeded by: Alex Carlile

Personal details
- Born: David John Delwyn Williams; 1 November 1938 Forden, Wales
- Died: 21 August 2024 (aged 85) Welshpool, Wales
- Party: Conservative (before 2007)
- Spouse: Olive Jerman (m. 1963)
- Children: 2
- Profession: Politician and solicitor

David John Delwyn Williams (1 November 1938 – 21 August 2024) was a British Conservative Party politician and solicitor.

== Early life ==
Williams was born in Forden, Montgomeryshire. He was educated at Welshpool High School and the University College of Wales, Aberystwyth, where he obtained an LL.B. degree. He subsequently qualified as a solicitor, working in Forden and Shrewsbury.

== Political career ==
Williams was elected to the Montgomeryshire County Council. He unsuccessfully fought the 1970 United Kingdom general election, and the February 1974 elections, the latter at Cardiganshire. He was elected member of parliament for the traditionally Liberal seat of Montgomeryshire in 1979, ousting Emlyn Hooson by a majority of 1,593 votes. He lost the seat by 668 votes after one term to the Liberal Alex Carlile in 1983. He was on the right wing of the party, and a strong supporter of Margaret Thatcher. After leaving parliament, he continued to work as a solicitor.

He stood in a by-election to Powys County Council in 2007 in the Welshpool, Gungrog ward as an Independent but came third behind the Liberal Democrat candidate and another Independent.

In the campaign for the 2015 General Election he publicly declared his support for the United Kingdom Independence Party, citing in at least one newspaper letter dissatisfaction with the Prime Ministerial record of David Cameron, and objection to proposals by the Conservatives to extend tax raising powers to the Welsh Assembly.

In September 2016 he criticised Wales Boundary Commission proposals that would partition the then Montgomeryshire UK Parliament seat between three neighbouring seats, claiming it would "create a bureaucratic nightmare" of three MPs representing the existing shire county area. He suggested instead the whole seat be amalgamated with the neighbouring Brecon and Radnorshire on grounds of their common administration under Powys County Council.

== Personal life and death ==
Williams married Olive Jerman in 1963, and they had two children.

As of 2015, Williams lived in Guilsfield, Montgomeryshire. He died on 21 August 2024, at the age of 85, in a hospice after an illness.

Parliament of the United Kingdom
Preceded by Emlyn Hooson	Member of Parliament for Montgomeryshire; 1979–1983	Succeeded by Alex Carlile
