= London Welsh Centre =

London Welsh Centre Canolfan Cymry Llundain
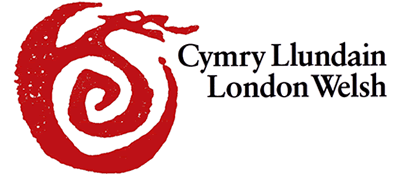
- Founded: 1920
- Founder: Margaret Lloyd George
- Purpose: The arts, Welsh culture and community
- Location: 157–163 Gray's Inn Road, Camden, London
- Coordinates: 51.5251°N 0.1171°W
- Owner: London Welsh Trust
- Website: www.londonwelsh.org
- Formerly called: Young Wales Association

The London Welsh Centre (Welsh: Canolfan Cymry Llundain) is a community and arts centre on Gray's Inn Road, in the London Borough of Camden. The centre is owned and run by the London Welsh Trust. It was founded as the Young Wales Association in 1920.

The centre is a base for three choirs: the London Welsh Chorale (Choral Cymry Llundain), the Gwalia Male Voice Choir, and the London Welsh Male Voice Choir. The centre also hosts Welsh language classes, concerts, drama productions, the Young Welsh Singer of the Year Competition, the London Welsh School's Eisteddfod y Plant, literary events, discussion programmes, and a variety of other events.

== History ==
The centre was built to provide a home for the Young Wales Association (YWA), which later became the London Welsh Association and is now the London Welsh Trust. The centre was built by Sir Howell J. Williams, who was a London-based building contractor and city council member. Williams gifted the building to the Young Welsh Association who, prior to the current buildings completion, were residing in a different plot of land also donated by Williams.

=== Young Wales Association ===
The Young Wales Association was founded on 21 October 1920 at the Portman Rooms, Baker Street, when more than 400 members of the London Welsh community attended a meeting presided over by Margaret Lloyd George (who became the YWA's first President). The YWA was founded partly as a tribute to the dead of the First World War but mainly as a meeting place for young Welsh migrants. It was registered as a company limited by guarantee in March 1925 under the title of "Young Wales Association (London) Limited" and later changed its name to the London Welsh Association Limited. The London Welsh Trust was established in 1964.

During the first decade of its life, the YWA lacked a permanent home. Meetings were held first in a little café in Villiers Street, then in the premises of Gwilym Thomas at 26 Upper Montagu Street and later thanks to Owen Picton Davies, at the Hotel Somerset. At lunch hosted by Picton Davies at one of his hotels in July 1928, Lord Atkin and David Lloyd George spoke in support of a movement to provide headquarters for the Young Wales Association in London. As a result, Sir Howell J. Williams, a building contractor and London County Council member, purchased a site of just over 15,000 square feet (1,400 m^{2}) bounded by Doughty Street and Mecklenburgh Square on the West and Gray's Inn Road on the East, and offered it as a free gift to the Young Wales Association. These premises were formally opened by Margaret Lloyd George on 29 November 1930. Coincidentally, the site was almost exactly opposite that in Gray's Inn Road which had been occupied from 1772 to 1857 by the Welsh Charity School.

=== Current building ===
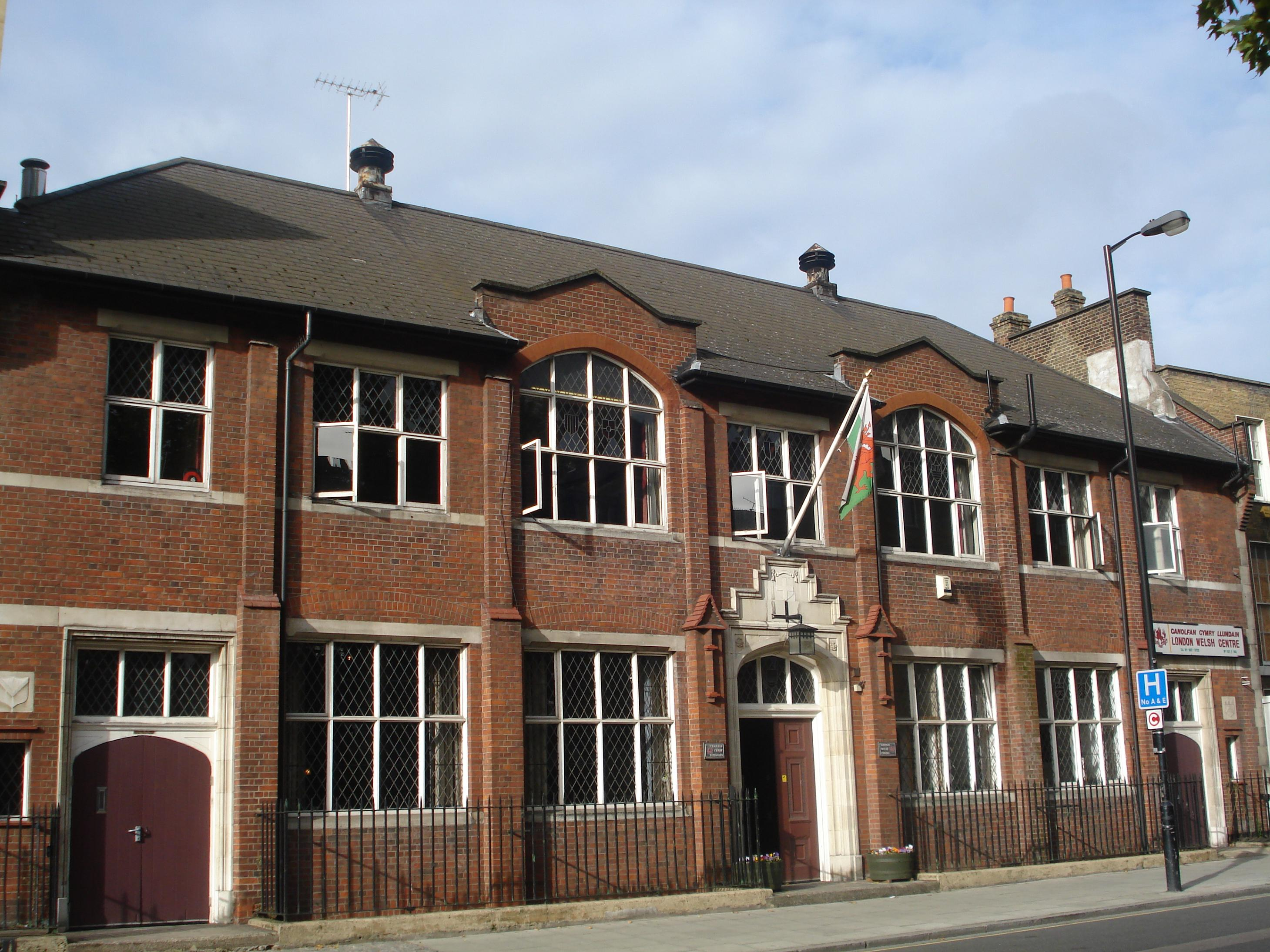
The London Welsh Centre on Gray's Inn Road

Sir Howell J. Williams later rebuilt the properties that fronted onto Gray's Inn Road and completed the main hall of the current London Welsh Centre. The new premises were formally handed over by Williams on 5 November 1937. The properties on Doughty Street and Mecklenburgh Square have since been sold off for residential use, but the premises fronting on to Gray's Inn Road remain in use as the modern-day London Welsh Centre.

The bar at the centre was officially opened by Harry Secombe on Saint Patrick's Day (17 March) 1971.

The building is in the Holborn conservation area.

=== World War II ===
During the period 1940–1946, the Welsh Services Club provided beds and meals for Welsh (and a few Canadian) military personnel passing through London. On 13 December 1941, the centre was officially committed for use as a Welsh Services Club. Lord Atkin was chair of the newly formed Welsh Services Club, which was opened by David Lloyd George.

== Activities ==
The centre seeks to promote the arts (primarily Welsh art and culture) and provide local community use facilities.

=== Magazine ===
The London Welsh Association's monthly magazine, Y Ddolen, was introduced in 1925. When it reappeared after the Second World War in October 1946, it was called Y Ddinas. Some idea of the range of activities at the London Welsh Centre in the post-war years can be gathered from the announcement in Y Ddinas for just one month, January 1948. The centre was the venue for three dances, two nights of community singing, a concert, two whist drives and an "at home". The centre's magazine is now published quarterly alongside regular newsletters by email.

=== Welsh Language Classes ===
Welsh language classes have been held more or less continuously at the London Welsh Centre since 1946. The Saturday morning Welsh classes for children, which began in 1957, resulted in the establishment of the London Welsh School a year later. Welsh language classes are now held at the centre each week, for three different levels of ability. All-day, intensive Welsh language courses are held on weekends, two or three times each year.

== Presidents of the London Welsh Trust ==
- 1921–1922 Dame Margaret Lloyd George
- 1923–1924 Sir Howell J Williams
- 1925–1926 T. Woodward Owen
- 1927 David Davies
- 1928–1930 Owen Picton Davies
- 1931–1932 J.T. Lewis,
- 1933 T.W Glyn Evans
- 1934–1935 David Lloyd George
- 1936–1937 Rhys Hopkin Morris
- 1938–1944 James Atkin, Baron Atkin,
- 1946–1947 Clement Davies
- 1947–1949 Sir Wynn P. Wheldon
- 1949–1951 Rev H. Elvet Lewis
- 1951–1953 Lord Justice Morris
- 1953–1955 Sir Ben Bowen Thomas
- 1955–1959 David Rees-Williams, 1st Baron Ogmore
- 1959–1962 Morys Bruce, 4th Baron Aberdare
- 1962–1964 Air Chief Marshal Sir Hugh Pughe Lloyd
- 1964–1969 William Harries
- 1969–1970 Morys Bruce, 4th Baron Aberdare
- 1970–1982 Michael Williams
- 1982–1988 Edmund Davies, Baron Edmund-Davies
- 1988–1994 Sir William Mars-Jones
- 1994–2001 Sir Maldwyn Thomas
- 2001–2008 John Morris, Baron Morris of Aberavon
- 2008–2023 Huw Edwards
- 2025-date Nan Williams
