= Owen Picton Davies =

Welsh Chairman and Director of Companies (1872–1940)

Owen Picton Davies (9 February 1872 – 4 June 1940), was a Welsh Chairman and Director of Companies and a Proprietor of Hotels. He was also a Liberal Party politician.

== Background ==
Davies was the son of John Davies Glanmamog, of Newcastle Emlyn, Carmarthenshire. He was educated at Capel Iwan, Newcastle Emlyn. In 1896 he married Amy Edith Hucket. They had four sons and two daughters.

== Professional career ==
In 1894 Davies moved to London. He was Chairman of St Paul’s Hospital, Endell Street, London. He was President of the Carmarthen County Infirmary. He was President of Young Wales Association of London. He was High Sheriff of Carmarthenshire from 1934–35. He had published the 'History of Capel Iwan Congregational Church'.

== Political career ==
Davies was actively involved in the founding of the London-based Young Wales Association in 1920. The association, a forerunner of the London Welsh Association, was formed to provide a social and political focal point for Welsh people living in London. Early on, one of Davies's hotels was used as a meeting venue. In 1928 he became Presidents of the London Welsh Trust, serving for a two-year term. He was Liberal candidate for the Clapham division of London at the 1929 General Election. Clapham was not a good prospect for the Liberals as it had been a Unionist seat since 1886. No Liberal candidate had stood at the previous general election. He polled a respectable third place vote;

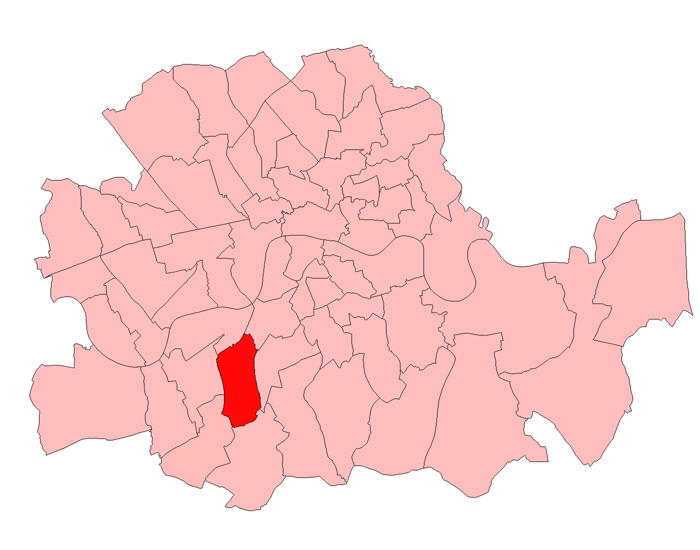
Clapham constituency in the County of London in 1929

General Election 1929: Clapham Electorate 48,061
Party	Candidate	Votes	%	±%
Unionist	Sir John Leigh	13,507	41.7	−22.4
Labour	J Allen Skinner	9,871	30.5	−5.4
Liberal	Owen Picton Davies	8,991	27.8	n/a
Majority		3,636	11.2	
Turnout			67.3	−2.2
Unionist hold		Swing		

He did not stand for parliament again.

== See also ==
- London Welsh Centre
