= 1985 Brecon and Radnor by-election =

UK parliamentary by-election

- 4 Jul 1985

Constituency of Brecon and Radnor
- Turnout: 79.4% (▼0.7%)
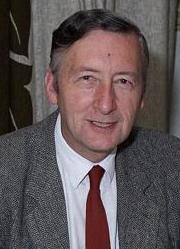
	First party	Second party	Third party
		Lab	Con
Candidate	Richard Livsey	Richard Willey	Chris Butler
Party	Liberal	Labour	Conservative
Popular vote	13,753	13,194	10,631
Percentage	35.8%	34.4%	27.7%
Swing	▲11.4%	▲9.4%	▼20.5%
MP before election
Tom Ellis Hooson
Conservative
Subsequent MP
Richard Livsey
Liberal

The 1985 Brecon and Radnor by-election was a parliamentary by-election held on 4 July 1985 for the House of Commons constituency of Brecon and Radnor.

== Previous MP ==
The seat had become vacant on 8 May 1985, when the constituency's Conservative Member of Parliament (MP), Tom Ellis Hooson, had died at the age of 52. He was a cousin of Emlyn Hooson, the former Liberal Party MP for Montgomery.

Tom Hooson had been Brecon and Radnor's MP since the 1979 general election, when he gained the seat from the Labour Party.

== Candidates ==
Seven candidates were nominated. Richard Arthur Lloyd Livsey was the candidate of the Liberal Party and represented the SDP–Liberal Alliance. He was a former senior lecturer in farm management, born in 1935, who had become a smallholder. He had contested the seat in the 1983 general election.

Frederick Richard Willey, born 1945 and commonly known as Richard Willey, was the Labour candidate. He was the son of veteran Labour MP Fred Willey and was an independent member of Radnor District Council, representing Presteigne ward. He was educated at King Alfred School and at St John's College, Cambridge, and was a freelance educational researcher and writer.

Christopher John Butler, born 1950, represented the Conservative Party. He was a special adviser to the Secretary of State for Wales and had previously worked at the Conservative Research Department in Wales and the Political Office in 10 Downing Street.

Janet Mary Davies was nominated by Plaid Cymru. She was born in 1938 and was a member of Taff Ely Borough Council.

Frequent election candidate and pop singer Screaming Lord Sutch (otherwise known as David Edward Sutch) represented the Monster Raving Loony Party.

Roger Everest was an independent candidate who sought election as a One Nation Conservative.

Andre Charles Leopold Genillard was an independent who campaigned as a Free the World from Multiple Sclerosis candidate. He was a teacher at Mayfield College, Mayfield, and entered the election as an educational exercise for students before electoral deposits substantially increased.

== Result ==
1985 Brecon and Radnor by-election
Party	Candidate	Votes	%	±%
Liberal	Richard Livsey	13,753	35.8	+11.4
Labour	Richard Willey	13,194	34.4	+9.4
Conservative	Chris Butler	10,631	27.7	−20.5
Plaid Cymru	Janet Davies	435	1.1	−0.6
Monster Raving Loony	Screaming Lord Sutch	202	0.5	N/A
One Nation Conservative	Roger Everest	154	0.4	N/A
Independent	Andre C. L. Genillard	43	0.1	N/A
Majority		559	1.4	N/A
Turnout		38,412	79.4	−0.7
Registered electors		48,371		
Liberal gain from Conservative		Swing	+16.0	

== Aftermath ==
Livsey held the seat for the Liberals at the 1987 general election, with a majority of just 56 over the Conservative Jonathan Evans with Labour dropping to third place. This meant that Brecon and Radnor was the only seat that the Conservatives lost at a by-election in the 1983-1987 parliament that they failed to regain at the 1987 election. However at the 1992 general election the Conservatives did regain the seat, although Richard Livsey went on to regain it at the 1997 general election.

== Previous result ==
General election 1983: Brecon and Radnor
Party	Candidate	Votes	%	±%
Conservative	Tom Hooson	18,255	48.2	+1.0
Labour	David Morris	9,471	25.0	−15.9
Liberal	Richard Livsey	9,226	24.4	+14.7
Plaid Cymru	Sian Meredudd	640	1.7	−0.4
Independent	Richard Booth	278	0.7	N/A
Majority		8,784	23.2	+16.9
Turnout		37,870	80.1	−4.1
Registered electors		47,277		
Conservative hold		Swing	+8.4	

== See also ==
- 2019 Brecon and Radnorshire by-election
- 1939 Brecon and Radnorshire by-election
- Brecon and Radnorshire constituency
- Lists of United Kingdom by-elections
- United Kingdom by-election records
