= Roger Roberts, Baron Roberts of Llandudno =

Welsh politician (born 1935)

The Reverend and Right Honourable The Lord Roberts of Llandudno
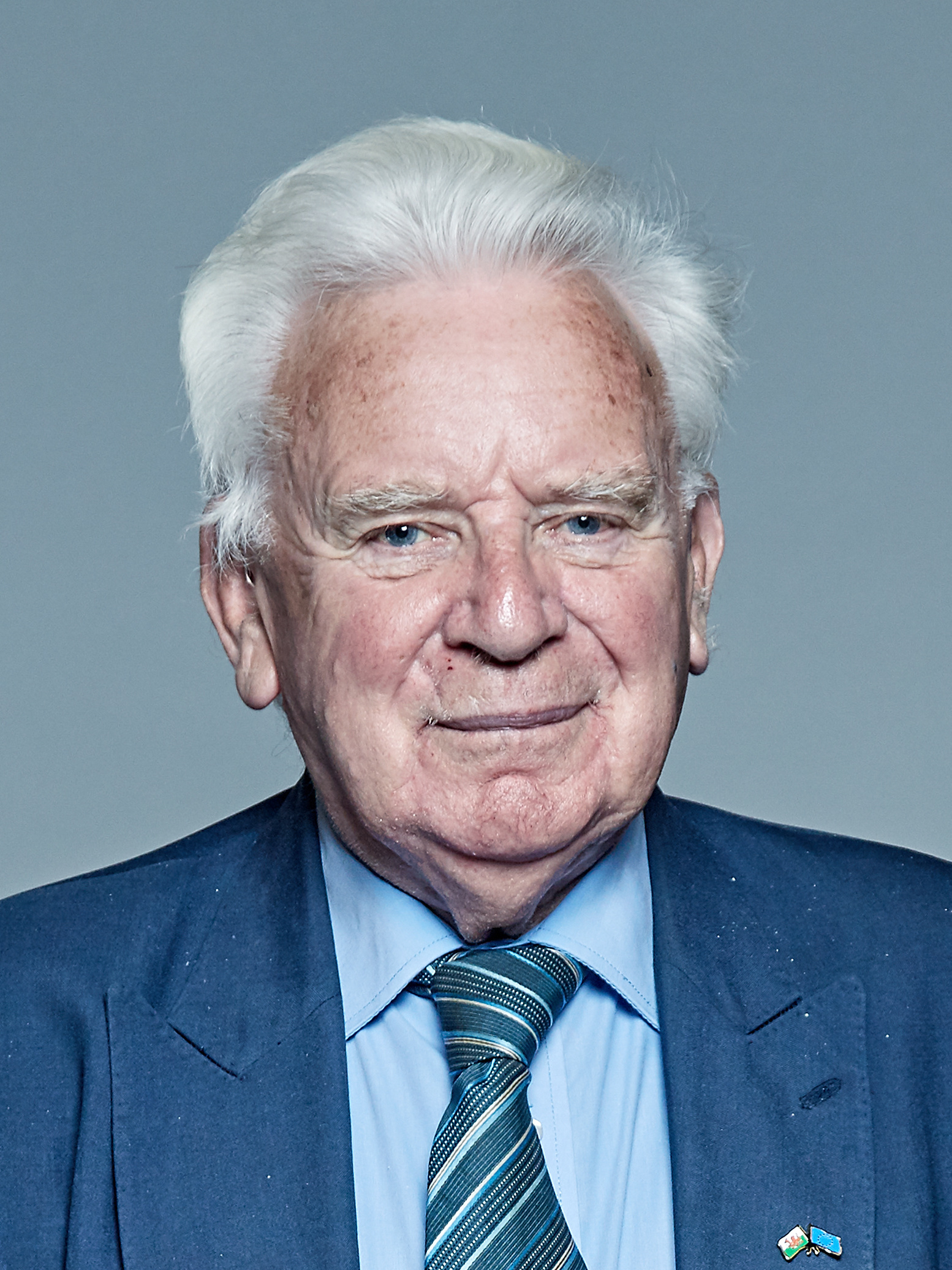

Member of the House of Lords
- Lord Temporal
- Life peerage 15 June 2004

Personal details
- Born: 23 October 1935 (age 91)
- Party: Liberal Democrats
- Website: www.lordrogerroberts.uk

John Roger Roberts, Baron Roberts of Llandudno (born 23 October 1935), is a Welsh Liberal Democrat politician, Methodist minister, and life peer. He was for many years President of the Welsh Liberals, and later, the Welsh Liberal Democrats.

== Education ==
Lord Roberts was educated at John Bright Grammar School, in Llandudno, the University College of North Wales, and Handsworth Methodist College, Birmingham.

== Career ==
=== Ordained ministry ===
In 1957, he became a Methodist minister, and was the superintendent Methodist minister at Llandudno for twenty years before serving as minister at the Dewi Sant (Welsh United) Church, Toronto. He is an active supernumerary minister in North Wales.

=== Political career ===
He was a councillor and a leader of the Liberal Democrats on Aberconwy Borough Council for a number of years, and stood as a candidate for the parliamentary seat of Conwy five times. He narrowly missed being elected the last two times he stood, first coming close to beating the Conservatives, with only a margin of 995 votes, and then being beaten by Labour in the General Election of 1997, when the Conservatives lost their majority in the House of Commons.

On 15 June 2004, Roberts was created a life peer as Baron Roberts of Llandudno, of Llandudno in the County of Gwynedd. A former whip and spokesperson on International Development, he now speaks on youth democratic engagement, unemployment, asylum, migration and Welsh affairs for the Liberal Democrats in the House of Lords.

Roberts is currently president of Wales International, is honorary president of Bite The Ballot, Liberal Democrats for Seekers of Sanctuary (LD4SOS) and Friends of Barka UK and is also vice-president of Llangollen International Music Eisteddfod.

== Personal life ==
Roberts' latest book, Hel Tai, is only available in Welsh.

He is a widower with three children and lives in Llandudno on the Creuddyn peninsula, North Wales. His son, Gareth Roberts, also stood for the same seat for the Liberal Democrats in 2005. His two daughters, Rhian Roberts and Sian Roberts work for the BBC and the Electoral Reform Services respectively.

Party political offices
Preceded by Martin Thomas	President of the Welsh Liberal Party; 1980–1983	Succeeded by Emlyn Hooson
Preceded by Tom Ellis	President of the Welsh Liberal Democrats; 1990–1993	Succeeded by Martin Thomas
Orders of precedence in the United Kingdom
Preceded by The Lord Truscott	Gentlemen; Baron Roberts of Llandudno	Followed by The Lord Giddens
