= Emlyn Hooson, Baron Hooson =

British politician (1925-2012)

The Right Honourable The Lord Hooson QC

Member of the House of Lords
- Lord Temporal
- Life peerage 26 July 1979 – 21 February 2012

Member of Parliament for Montgomeryshire
- In office 15 May 1962 – 7 April 1979
- Preceded by: Clement Davies
- Succeeded by: Delwyn Williams

Personal details
- Born: Hugh Emlyn Hooson; 26 March 1925 Colomendy, Denbighshire, Wales
- Died: 21 February 2012 (aged 86) Newtown, Powys, Wales
- Party: Liberal Democrats (after 1988); Liberal (until 1988)
- Spouse: Shirley Hamer (m. 1950)
- Children: 2
- Education: University College of Wales, Aberystwyth
- Military career
- Allegiance: United Kingdom
- Branch: Royal Navy
- Service years: 1942-1945
- Conflicts: Second World War

Hugh Emlyn Hooson, Baron Hooson, QC (26 March 1925 – 21 February 2012) was a Welsh Liberal and then Liberal Democrat politician. He was the Member of Parliament (MP) for Montgomeryshire from 1962 until 1979.

== Early life ==
Hooson was born at Colomendy in Denbighshire on 26 March 1925, the middle child of three sons to Hugh and Elsie Hooson. He was educated at Denbigh Grammar School and read law at the University College of Wales, Aberystwyth. He joined the Royal Navy in 1943 and served during the Second World War, on a corvette in the north Atlantic.

== Legal career ==
He became a barrister, called to the bar by Gray's Inn in 1949, and in 1960 became one of the youngest ever Queen's Counsel, aged 35. He was chairman of the Flint Quarter Sessions from 1960 and Merioneth Quarter Sessions from 1962, until he became Recorder of Merthyr Tydfil and Swansea in 1971. He was a member of the Bar Council from 1965.

As QC, Hooson represented Ian Brady, one of the "Moors Murderers" along with Myra Hindley, when Brady was tried and convicted of three murder charges at Chester Assizes in spring 1966. He described some of the evidence against Brady as "flimsy".

In 1970 he appeared for the Ministry of Defence at a public inquiry over plans to move its experimental range from Shoeburyness in Essex to Pembrey, near Carmarthen.

He went on to become Recorder of both Merthyr Tydfil and Swansea in 1971, Elected Leader of the Wales and Chester Circuit 1971 to 1974, he was a Recorder of the Crown Court from 1972 until 1991, as well as a Deputy High Court Judge.

He was President of the Cambrian Law Review and was the Hon. Professional Fellow of the University of Wales, Aberystwyth.

== Political career ==
Hooson became chairman of the Liberal Party of Wales in 1955 and was elected to the Liberal Party executive in 1965. He contested Conway at the 1950 general election and again in 1951.

As Chairman of the Liberal Party of Wales, he led its merger with the North and South Wales Liberal Federations, thereby uniting liberalism in Wales in the Welsh Liberal Party.

He became MP for Montgomeryshire at a 1962 by-election following the death of Clement Davies, as a member of the Liberal Party. He contested the Liberal Party leadership election of 1967, but withdrew in favour of Jeremy Thorpe after gaining only a quarter of the votes in the first ballot.

Initially being Eurosceptic, Hooson was the only Liberal MP to vote against entry into the Common Market in a 'free vote' division on 28 October 1971, although he campaigned for a 'Yes' (Remain) vote in the 1975 referendum. He later became solidly more pro-European telling an audience at a Welsh Political Archive lecture in the 1990s:

"Whereas almost without exception the Liberals of Wales were for it, I had developed doubts about that particular route to a United Europe and voted against entry. In retrospect I think I should have voted for it, although I believe my reasons for delaying our entry, as I explained them then, largely proved to be correct."

Hooson also wrote in a draft of his unfinished and unpublished autobiography: "I believe we need a federal Europe"

He introduced the Government of Wales Bill on St David's Day 1967, taking one of the first steps to the formation of the Welsh Assembly.

At the 1979 general election, Hooson lost his seat to the Conservatives and was then appointed a life peer as Baron Hooson, of Montgomery in the County of Powys and of Colomendy in the County of Clwyd. Montgomeryshire was regained by the Liberal Party at the next general election; it was then held by the Liberal Party and its successor party, the Liberal Democrats, until the 2010 general election.

Hooson sat for the Liberal Democrats in the House of Lords, where he was active in improving the Mental Health Act, urged police reforms and spoke on law reform and drug trafficking.

Hooson was vice-chairman of the North Atlantic Assembly's political committee, where he worked with Congressman John Lindsay on one of the early reports recommending détente with eastern Europe.

== Personal life and other interests ==
In 1950, Hooson married Shirley Hamer, daughter of Sir George Hamer, Lord Lieutenant of Montgomeryshire. They had two daughters, Sioned and Lowri. He sent his daughters to London's only Welsh-speaking school, and chaired its governors. The family home was in Llanidloes, where Lord Hooson's funeral was held in the China Street Chapel.

In 1980 he chaired a consortium that bid for the Wales and West television franchise, and became a member of the ITV Advisory Council.

In 1985, Emlyn Hooson became a non-executive director of Laura Ashley, and was later made chairman in 1995. He was already Chairman of the Trustees of the Laura Ashley Foundation, a post he filled from 1986 to 1997.

From 1991 to 2000, he was Chairman of Severn River Crossing PLC, the company operating both the Severn Bridge and the Second Severn Crossing.

He became President of the National Eisteddfod of Wales at Newtown in 1966 and the following year, he was made Honorary White Bard of the National Gorsedd of Bards. Between 1987 and 1993, Hooson was the President of the International Eisteddfod, held annually at Llangollen. He was a Member of the Aberystwyth Old Students' Association and served as President (1991–92) between the two presidencies of Sir David Nicholas.

A farmer, Hooson was a member of an old North Wales agricultural family. He was a cousin (and political opponent) of Tom Hooson, a Conservative MP who died in 1985.

Lord and Lady Hooson also held the position of President of Llidiartywaen Young Farmers Club for many years. Until his ill health, an annual occurrence was the young farmers being invited in every Christmas Eve to sing carols around the fireside.

Hooson died at a care home in Newtown, Powys, on 21 February 2012. Lady Hooson died in 2018.

== Honours ==
France and Germany Star
Defence Medal (United Kingdom)
War Medal 1939–1945

Country	Date	School	Degree
Wales	2003	University of Wales	Honorary Ll.D

== See also ==
- A Very English Scandal (TV series)

== Sources ==
=== Books and Journals ===
- Jones, J. Graham (June 1993). "The Liberal Party and Wales, 1945-79". Welsh History Review. 16 (3): 326–55.
- The Times Guide to the House of Commons, Times Newspapers Ltd, 1950 & 1966
- Derec Llwyd Morgan Ed (2014), Emlyn Hooson, Essays and Reminiscences, Gomer

Parliament of the United Kingdom
Preceded by Clement Davies	Member of Parliament for Montgomeryshire; 1962–1979	Succeeded by Delwyn Williams
Party political offices
Preceded by New position	Leader of the Welsh Liberal Party; 1966–1979	Succeeded by Geraint Howells
Preceded by Roger Roberts	President of the Welsh Liberal Party; 1983–1985	Succeeded by Sir Maldwyn Thomas
Professional and academic associations
Preceded by Sir David Nicholas	President of the Aberystwyth Old Students' Association; 1991–1992	Succeeded by Sir David Nicholas
