= Marx Memorial Library =

Library and archive in London focused on Marxist, Marxian, and other socialist literature

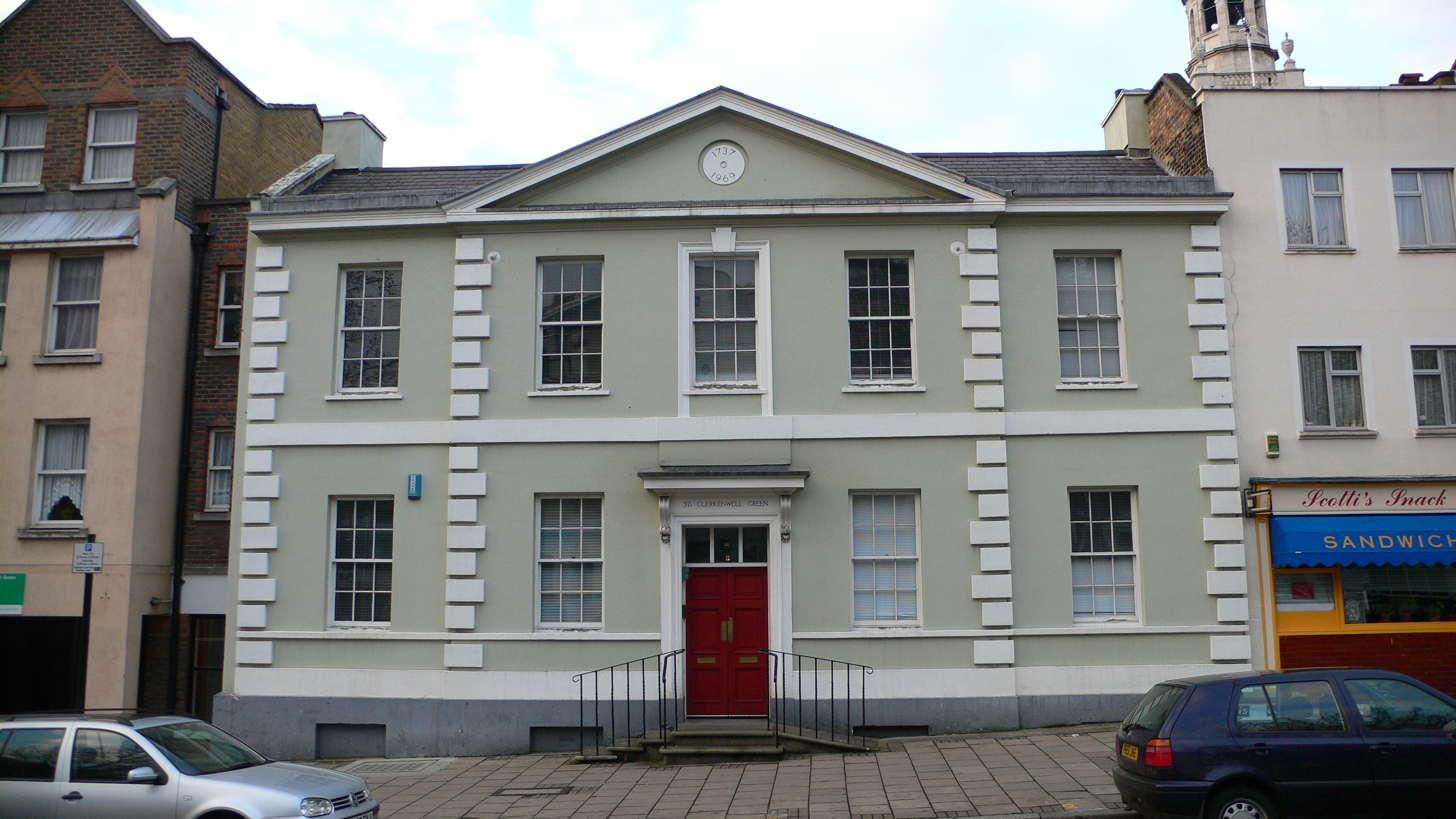
- Marx Memorial Library
- 51.5229°N 0.1057°W
- Location: Clerkenwell Green; London, EC1R, United Kingdom
- Type: Library
- Established: 1933 (93 years ago)
- Architect: James Steere
- Branches: 1

Collection
- Items collected: Books, journals, newspapers, magazines, prints, drawings and manuscripts
- Size: 60,000+ items (2021)
- Legal deposit: No

Access and use
- Access requirements: Open to anyone with a need to use the collections and services

Other information
- Budget: £2 million GBP (2020)
- Director: Prof David McLellan (president)
- Website: marx-memorial-library.org.uk

Listed Building – Grade II
- Official name: Marx Memorial Library
- Designated: 29 September 1972
- Reference no.: 1279541

The Marx Memorial Library in London, United Kingdom is a library, archive, educational, and community outreach charity focused on Marxist and wider socialist bodies of work.

The library opened in 1933, and is located at 37a Clerkenwell Green, formerly home to many radical organisations and base of an important publishing operation. The building, originally opened in 1738 as the Welsh Charity School, is Grade II listed. The library's collection comprises over 60,000 books, pamphlets, items, and newspapers on Marxism, socialism, and working class history.

== Building background (1738–1932) ==
=== Early history ===
The building now occupied by the library was originally built in 1737–1738 to house the Welsh Charity School. It was designed by James Steer, and the construction funded by subscriptions. The school moved out to a new home in Gray's Inn Lane (now Gray's Inn Road) in 1772. The building subsequently became (in part) a public house, the Northumberland Arms; and was put to other commercial uses.

Part of it was occupied from 1872 onwards by the radical London Patriotic Society; and from 1893 (with the financial backing of William Morris) by the Twentieth Century Press Ltd, publishers of Justice, the newspaper of the Social Democratic Federation.

=== Vladimir Lenin and Iskra ===
In 1902–1903 exiled Russian revolutionary Vladimir Lenin worked in the building that would become the Marx Memorial Library, publishing seventeen issues of his newspaper Iskra (Spark) from within the building. The office he allegedly used is preserved as a memorial to him, although this room did not in fact exist at the time he was there: however, he may have worked in an earlier office partly on its site.

== Marx Memorial Library (1933–present) ==
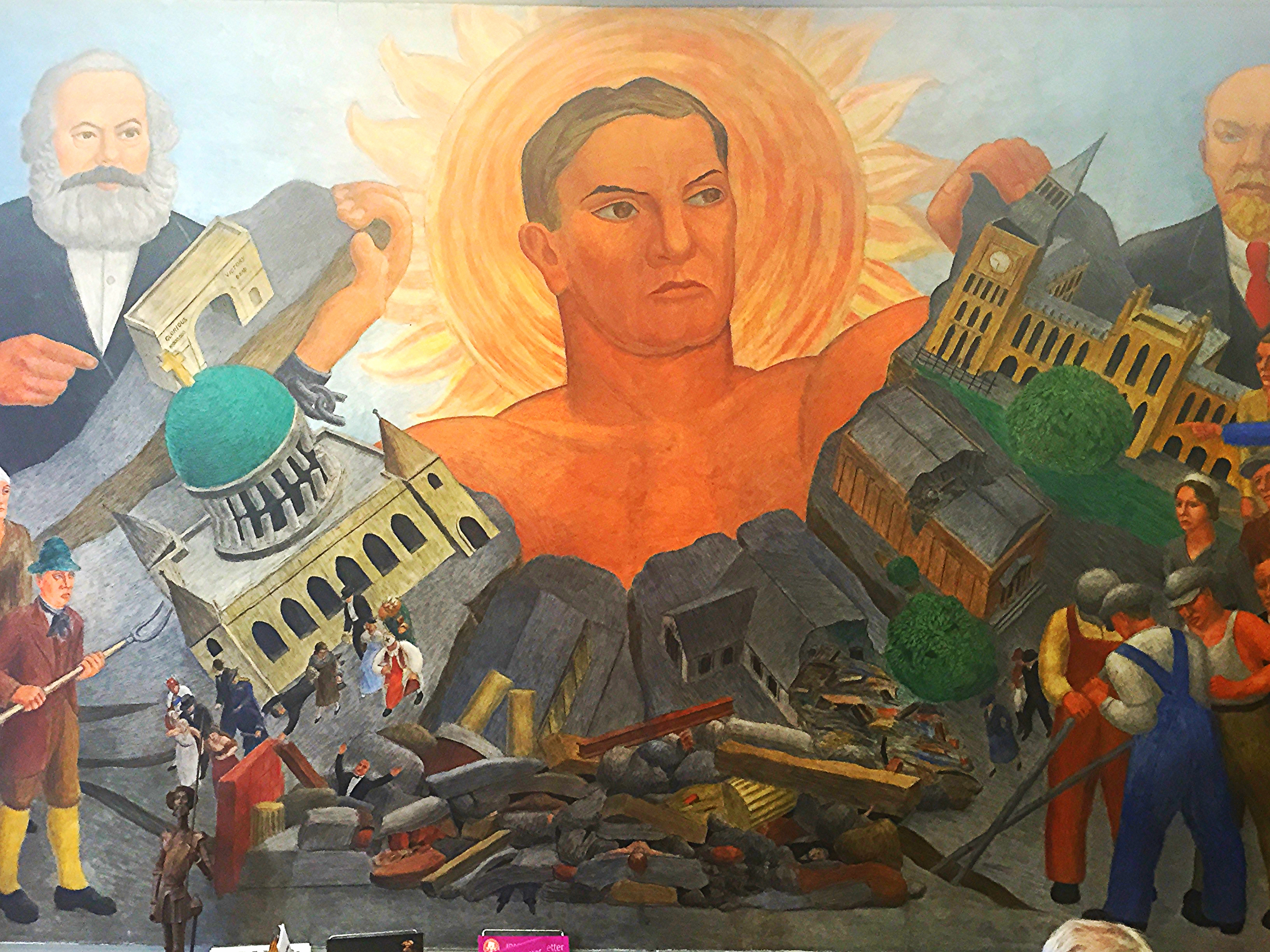
The worker of the future upsetting the economic chaos of the present: mural by Jack Hastings, 1935

The Marx Memorial Library was founded in 1933, originally only occupying a part of the building but eventually taking over every room.

The library features the fresco The worker of the future upsetting the economic chaos of the present, painted by Jack Hastings in 1935 with the assistance of the American artist, Clifford Wight.

Through these changes of use, the fabric had undergone numerous alterations and dilapidations, and in 1968–1969 the building underwent a major programme of work to restore the 18th-century appearance of the front. The necessary interventions and reconstructions were so drastic that the result is described by the Survey of London as "a modern quasifacsimile – of the original only the outer quoins can have survived".

The library building was listed Grade II on the National Heritage List for England in September 1972.

== Collections ==
As of 2021, over 60,000 items are held by the library. Holdings include the first edition of The Red Republican (1850), the Votes for Women suffragette newspaper, and other socialist publications.

The library now also houses "The Printers Collection" consisting of the archives of the printing and papermaking unions of the UK and Ireland. The collection includes union documents, magazines, photographs, badges and memorabilia. The archive was opened in March 2009 by Derek Simpson Joint General Secretary of Unite and Tony Burke, Assistant General Secretary of Unite.

== Governance ==
The first president of the library in 1933 was Alex Gossip, president of the Socialist Sunday Schools.

== Journal ==
The library publishes an annual journal, Theory & Struggle, published by Liverpool University Press. Its current editor (2021) is Marjorie Mayo.

== Bibliography ==
- Begley, W. W.; Betjeman, J.; Briggs, Asa; Broadwood, Evelyn; Driberg, Tom; Hill, Christopher; Paget, Paul; Spear, Ruskin; et al. (5 May 1967). "A House Worth Saving (letter)". The Times. London. p. 11.(subscription required)
- Rothstein, Andrew (1966). A House on Clerkenwell Green. London: Lawrence & Wishart.
- Temple, Philip, ed. (2008). "Clerkenwell Green". South and East Clerkenwell. Survey of London. Vol. 46. New Haven, London: English Heritage. pp. 86–114. ISBN 9780300137279.
