= John Powell Ward =

English poet and academic

- Born: 1937 (age 88–89)

John Powell Ward (born 1937) is an English poet and academic. He is an Honorary Research Fellow in the College of Arts and Humanities at Swansea University.

John Powell Ward was born in Felixstowe, Suffolk. He studied at the University of Toronto and the University of Cambridge before embarking on an academic career in Swansea. Between 1977 and 1984, he was a regular presenter of the BBC radio programme Poetry Now, and from 1975 to 1980 he edited Poetry Wales. In 2012, an exhibition of his "Poetry or Type" concrete and experimental poetry was on view at the Hay-on-Wye Poetry Jamboree.

He is the father of the actor Tom Ward.

== Works ==
=== Poetry ===
- The Other Man (Christopher Davies, 1969)
- To Get Clear (Poetry Wales Press, 1981)
- The Clearing (Poetry Wales Press, 1984)
- A Certain Marvellous Thing (Seren, 1993)
- Genesis (Seren, 1997)
- Late Thoughts in March (Seren, 1999)
- Selected and New Poems (Seren, 2004)
- The Last Green Year (Cinnamon Press, 2008)
- Instead Of Goodbye (Cinnamon Press, 2017)
- Religious Poems, Maybe (Cinnamon Press 2020)

=== Criticism ===
- Social Reality for the Adolescent Girl (University of Wales, Swansea 1976)
- Poetry and the Sociological Idea (Harvester Press, 1981)
- Wordsworth's Language of Men (Harvester Press, 1984)
- Raymond Williams (University of Wales Press, 1984)
- The English Line (Macmillan, 1991)
- As You Like It (Harvester: Shakespeare New Readings, 1992)
- Thomas Hardy's Poetry (Open University Guides, 1993)
- The Poetry of R. S. Thomas (Seren Books: Poetry Wales Press, 1987)
- The Spell of the Song: Letters, Meaning, and English Poetry (Fairleigh-Dickinson University Press USA, 2004)

=== Awards ===
- Poetry and the Sociological Idea, Welsh Arts Council Award for literary criticism, 1981
- The Clearing, Welsh Arts Council Award for poetry, 1984
- The Spell of the Song, Outstanding Academic Title Citation, American Libraries Association, 2004
