= Tom Hooson =

British Conservative Party politician (1933-1985)

Member of Parliament for Brecon and Radnorshire
- In office 3 May 1979 – 8 May 1985
- Preceded by: Caerwyn Roderick
- Succeeded by: Richard Livsey

Personal details
- Born: 16 March 1933
- Died: 8 May 1985 (aged 52) London, England
- Party: Conservatives
- Relations: Emlyn Hooson (Cousin)
- Education: University College, Oxford; Gray's Inn

Tom Ellis Hooson (16 March 1933 – 8 May 1985) was a British Conservative Party politician.

== Personal life and background ==
Hooson was the cousin (and political opponent) of Emlyn Hooson, former Liberal Party MP for Montgomeryshire.

Hooson was educated at Rhyl Grammar School, University College, Oxford and Gray's Inn. Before entering politics, he was as a journalist for The Times, and later worked in publishing and advertising, becoming a senior vice president with Benton & Bowles.

== Political career ==
He first stood for Parliament at Caernarvon in 1959, but was beaten by Labour's Goronwy Roberts. He was a chairman of the Bow Group.

He was Member of Parliament (MP) in the United Kingdom for Brecon and Radnor. He gained the seat from Labour in 1979, and held it until he died from cancer at his home in Chelsea, London on 8 May 1985, aged 52. The Liberals won the resulting by-election by a narrow margin of 559 votes over Labour.

Parliament of the United Kingdom
Preceded by Caerwyn Roderick	Member of Parliament for Brecon & Radnor; 1979 – 1985	Succeeded by Richard Livsey
