= Welsh Liberal Party =

Former political party in Wales

- Founded: 1898
- Dissolved: 3 March 1988
- Merged into: Welsh Liberal Democrats
- Headquarters: Dumfries Chambers, Cardiff
- Ideology: Liberalism
- National affiliation: Liberal Party

The Welsh Liberal Party was the section of the Liberal Party operating in Wales. From the 1860s until the First World War, a close relationship developed between particular issues relevant to Welsh politics and the Liberal Party. These included land reform, temperance, the expansion and reform of elementary education and, most prominently, the disestablishment of the Church of England in Wales. In the decade after 1886, there emerged another issue in the form of Home Rule as espoused by the Cymru Fydd movement but, for some within the Liberal Party in Wales this was a step too far and it came close to breaking the party.

The Liberal Party in Wales survived this crisis and at the 1906 General Election won almost every Welsh constituency. The First World War was a turning point, however. The post-war Coalition government's failure, under the leadership of David Lloyd George, to implement the recommendations of the Sankey Commission to nationalise the coal industry led to a collapse of support for the Liberals in the South Wales coalfield. At the same time, the acrimonious split between Lloyd George and Asquith in 1916 had a permanent legacy in rural Wales and led to the party's fortunes declining to such an extent that it remained a force in only a small number of rural constituencies. A revival in the party's fortunes in the 1960s and 1970s was limited in Wales by the emergence of a rival 'third-force' in the form of Plaid Cymru.

== Early history ==
From the late nineteenth century, Liberal Party activists in Wales were organised in two separate federations, one for the North and one for the south. In 1898, David Lloyd George created the Welsh National Liberal Council, a loose umbrella organisation covering the two federations, but with very little power. In time, it became known as the Liberal Party of Wales.

== The Lloyd George era ==
After World War I, David Lloyd George remained Prime Minister and leader of a national government. The Welsh National Liberal Council remained loyal to him, but a substantial majority wished to stand for independent Liberal Party candidates, and formed the rival Welsh Liberal Federation, with Henry Gladstone as their president. In 1924, the Welsh Liberal Federation rejoined the National Council, against the lone objection of Rhys Hopkin Morris.

However, this apparent coming together of the two wings of the Liberal Party camouflaged some deep divisions. In addition to the failure of the Coalition Government to implement the Sankey recommendations on the coal industry, the party was regarded as maintaining a focus on pre-war issues and controversies and being an essentially rural movement. The 1931 General Election saw the return of twelve Liberal MPs in Wales, although they were hopelessly divided. Four supported the faction led by Sir John Simon which made them indistinguishable from the Conservatives, another four supported the party leader, Herbert Samuel, while the remaining four formed a 'Lloyd George family group', including Lloyd George himself, his children Gwilym and Megan, and Goronwy Owen, who was related to the family by marriage. This group opposed the National Government throughout the 1930s.

In 1926, a Women's National Liberal Council for Wales was created.

== Post-war resilience and decline ==
At the 1945 General Election, the Liberal Party was reduced to a small group of twelve MPs, of whom seven represented Welsh constituencies. This group of seven has been described by a prominent historian of Welsh Liberalism, J. Graham Jones, as "a disparate team. lacking in cohesion and a common political philosophy". Emrys Roberts and Megan Lloyd George were increasingly close to Labour on issues such as the formation of the National Health Service. In contrast, Lady Megan's brother Gwilym, who represented Pembrokeshire, drifted towards the Conservatives and had the Liberal whip withdrawn in 1946. Clement Davies, who became party leader in 1945, and had represented Montgomeryshire since 1929, had been a member of the Liberal faction led by Sir John Simon in the 1930s but had subsequently become more radical in his views. Rhys Hopkin Morris, who won Carmarthen from Labour against the tide in 1945, was fiercely independent in his views, while Roderic Bowen, elected for the first time in Cardiganshire in 1945, was at the time an unknown quantity. Finally, the University of Wales seat (abolished in 1950) was held by the academic Professor W. J. Gruffydd, who had defeated former Plaid Cymru president Saunders Lewis in a fiercely contested by-election in 1943. Despite these differences within the group, the fact remained that the rural west and north Wales was now one of the party's last remaining sources of significant support. To some extent, this reflected the continuing correlation between Liberalism and nonconformity, although it has been suggested that the connection was sustained more by habit than conviction.

During the 1945-50 Parliament the Liberal MPs for Wales often disagreed amongst themselves on their attitudes towards Labour policies and often voted in different ways. The 1951 General Election was the end of an era for Welsh radical Liberalism as both Lady Megan Lloyd George and Emrys Roberts lost their seats in Anglesey and Merioneth respectively. The three remaining Welsh Liberal MPs were on the right of the party and, for several elections, did not face Conservative opposition in their constituencies.

By 1966, the Liberal Party was struggling in Wales. Emlyn Hooson convinced a majority of delegates to merge both federations into the organisation, which became known as the Welsh Liberal Party. The new party had far more authority, and gradually centralised the finances and policy of the party in Wales.

== Leadership ==
=== Leader ===
Until 1966, the party did not have an individual leader in Wales.
1966: Emlyn Hooson
1983: Geraint Howells

=== Chair ===
The position was created in 1904.
1904: Edward Thomas (Cochfarf)
1908: Viscount St Davids
1925: John Hinds
1928: Victor Evans
as of 1930-39: J. Walter Jones
as of 1949-54: Parry Brown
as of 1950: Alfred E. Hughes
as of 1959-64: Glyn Tegai Hughes
1964: Alun Talfan Davies
1966: Emlyn Hooson
1968: Martin Thomas
1973: Geraint Howells
1974:
as of 1975: Gareth Morgan
as of 1977-80: John Roberts
1980: Alex Carlile
1982: Winston Roddick

=== President ===
1898: Thomas Gee
1899: Thomas Williams of Merthyr
1901: J. R. Jacob
1902: Evan Spicer
1903: Herbert Lewis
1904: David Lloyd George
1945: Clement Davies
1948: Roderic Bowen
1949: Emrys Roberts
1951:
as of 1964: Clement Davies
as of 1968-71: Baron Ogmore
1971: Rhys Lloyd
1974: Geraint Howells
1977: Martin Thomas
1979: Roger Roberts
1983: Emlyn Hooson
1985: Maldwyn Thomas
1986: Gruffydd Evans
1987:

== Sources ==
=== Books and Journals ===
- Jones, J. Graham (June 1993). "The Liberal Party and Wales, 1945-79" (PDF). Welsh History Review. 16 (3): 326–55.
