= Richard Livsey, Baron Livsey of Talgarth =

British politician (1935–2010)

The Right Honourable The Lord Livsey of Talgarth CBE
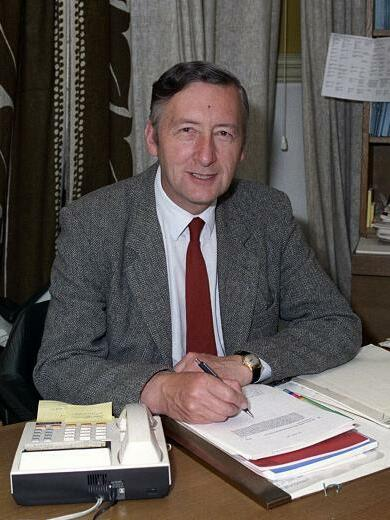
- Undated photo of Richard Livsey

Member of Parliament for Brecon and Radnorshire
- In office 1 May 1997 – 14 May 2001
- Preceded by: Jonathan Evans
- Succeeded by: Roger Williams
- In office 4 July 1985 – 16 March 1992
- Preceded by: Tom Hooson
- Succeeded by: Jonathan Evans

Member of the House of Lords
- Lord Temporal
- Life peerage 28 August 2001 – 16 September 2010

Personal details
- Born: 2 May 1935
- Died: 16 September 2010 (aged 75)
- Party: Liberal Democrat
- Education: Bedales School

Richard Arthur Lloyd Livsey, Baron Livsey of Talgarth CBE (2 May 1935 – 16 September 2010) was a British Liberal Democrat politician who served as the Member of Parliament (MP) for Brecon and Radnorshire from 1985 to 1992, and again from 1997 to 2001.

== Family and education ==
He was the son of Arthur Norman Livsey and Lilian Maisie (née James). His father was a seacaptain who died in Iraq when Richard was just three years old. He was therefore brought up in a single parent household by his mother, Lilian, who was a local teacher and headmistress. It was she who had a great influence in his life.

Baron Livsey was educated at Talgarth County Primary, Bedales School, Seale-Hayne Agricultural College and Reading University (MSc in agricultural management).

On 3 April 1964 he married Irene Earsman of Castle Douglas, Galloway, Scotland, and they went on to have two sons and one daughter.

== Employment history ==
Livsey was an agricultural development officer for ICI from 1961 to 1967. He then went on to become the farm manager on the Blairdrummond Estate in Perthshire from 1967 to 1971. He then returned to Wales as a senior lecturer at the Welsh Agricultural College, Llanbadarn Fawr until 1985. He had one further spell in employment outside of Westminster politics when he lost office in 1992, as the Development Manager of ATB-Landbase Cymru from 1993 to 1997.

== Political career ==
Livsey joined the Liberal Party in Wales in 1960. In 1970 he stood unsuccessfully as the party's Scottish candidate in Perth and East Perthshire. When he returned to Wales he became active in the Welsh Liberal Party and stood unsuccessfully for Pembroke in 1979 and Brecon and Radnor in 1983. Livsey had been a keen supporter and activist during the 1979 St David's Day referendum on a Welsh Assembly on behalf of the Yes Campaign. He continued to be central to the pro devolution cause and was the leader of the Liberal Democrat campaign in the successful 1997 Welsh devolution referendum.

Livsey won his home constituency at the second attempt at the 1985 Brecon and Radnor by-election (it subsequently became Brecon and Radnorshire), as a Liberal, with a majority of 559. The by-election was one of the most notable successes of the SDP-Liberal Alliance period. It was the only Welsh Liberal parliamentary gain in Wales.

With a background as a farm manager and lecturer in farm management, he joined Parliament's Select Committee on Agriculture. Livsey joined a group of three Welsh Liberal MPs (the others being his friend and mentor Geraint Howells, and Alex Carlile). He held the same seat in the 1987 general election, subsequently becoming the Liberal Democrat spokesman on Wales, and held the position of Leader of the Party in Wales from 1988 to 1992. He was also a member of the Welsh Affairs Select Committee.

He lost the Brecon & Radnorshire seat at the 1992 United Kingdom general election by the narrow margin of 130 votes, but regained it again at the 1997 United Kingdom general election, with a majority of over 5,000. He then became leader of the Welsh Liberal Democrats until he stood down in 2001. In that same year he was ennobled as Baron Livsey of Talgarth. As well as being a central figure in Welsh Liberal politics in the post war era Baron Livsey's main success was to build Brecon and Radnor into a Liberal Democrat stronghold which enabled Kirsty Williams (Assembly Member) and his successor Roger Williams to further strengthen the Liberal Democrat hold there.

Livsey was appointed a Commander of the Order of the British Empire (CBE) in the 1994 Birthday Honours.

== Involvement with the community ==
Livsey was an extremely active as a constituency MP and remained involved with the community, afterwards. He was patron of and active in many of the organisations in Brecon and Radnor. These included a role as President of the Hay Festival, chairman of the Brecon Jazz Festival and a member of the Talgarth Male Choir. He sang with them at their appearance at the Royal Albert Hall in 2009.

He was succeeded by Roger Williams at the 2001 United Kingdom general election and was created a life peer on 28 August 2001 with the title Baron Livsey of Talgarth of Talgarth in the County of Powys.

He became a fellow of Aberystwyth University in 2007.

Parliament of the United Kingdom
Preceded by Tom Hooson	Member of Parliament for Brecon and Radnorshire; 1985–1992	Succeeded by Jonathan Evans
Preceded by Jonathan Evans	Member of Parliament for Brecon and Radnorshire; 1997–2001	Succeeded by Roger Williams
Party political offices
Preceded by Geraint Howells; Leader of the Welsh Liberal Party	Leader of the Welsh Liberal Democrats; 1988–1992	Succeeded by Alex Carlile
Preceded by Alex Carlile	Leader of the Welsh Liberal Democrats; 1997–2001	Succeeded by Lembit Öpik
