= London Welsh School =

Coordinates: 51.5407°N 0.2638°W

Ysgol Gymraeg Llundain

Location
- Westcott Crescent; London, W7 1PD; England

Information
- Other name: London Welsh School
- Type: Independent School
- Motto: A Fynn a Fedr ('Who persists achieves')
- Established: 1958
- Department for Education URN: 101573 Tables
- Ofsted: Reports
- Chair: Glenys Roberts
- Head Teacher: Julie Katherine Watkins (Sept 2023- Aug 2025)
- Gender: All
- Age: 3 to 11
- Enrolment: 12 (2023-24)
- Capacity: 40
- Language: Welsh
- Colours: Red and green
- School fees: For 2024–25, the fees are £4368 a year or £364 a month for children aged 5 years and older. (2023-24 £4260 or £355 respectively). Fees are paid monthly via standing order over the 12 months of the academic year in equal instalments. The fees are reviewed annually.
- Website: http://www.ysgolgymraegllundain.co.uk

The London Welsh School (Welsh: Ysgol Gymraeg Llundain) is a Welsh medium primary school in London, England. Welsh is the language predominantly used for all classes and activities. The school offers a bilingual education to children aged four to 11. The school also has a pre-school class for three and four-year-old children, and a baby and toddler group called Miri Mawr that meets on Monday mornings.

== History ==
The London Welsh School's origins date back to Saturday morning Welsh language classes taught at the London Welsh Centre in 1955. The school was then founded in 1958 by a group of fathers who were sending their children to those language classes.

For much of its history the school was the only Welsh medium institution located outside Wales until the opening of a Welsh language school in Patagonia, Argentina. That institution, the Ysgol yr Hendre, was opened on 6 March 2006 in Trelew to serve the Welsh-Argentine community.

In 2000 the London Welsh School was forced to leave its home since 1961, the Welsh Chapel in Willesden Green, but then relocated to Stonebridge Park primary school in Brent. Speaking in the Houses of Parliament in June 2000, Julie Morgan, MP for Cardiff North, described the school as part of the general demand for Welsh language education in Wales and a lifeline for families moving temporarily to London.

In 2015 the school moved to its current home Hanwell Community Centre in Hanwell, London borough of Ealing, a building with a long history as an educational setting having been home to a school attended by Charlie Chaplin between 1896 and 1898.

== Recent Years ==
The London Welsh School has, for many years, been invited to the Houses of Parliament to take part in the St. David's Day service where the children typically perform in front of the Speaker of the House of Commons.

A number of well-known Welsh figures have sent their children to the London Welsh School over the years, including Cerys Matthews, Sean Fletcher, and Sioned Wiliam.

In 2019, the London Welsh School were winners of the Cân Actol Blwyddyn 6 ac iau at the Urdd National Eisteddfod in Cardiff Bay.

The school has been eminently successful and is one of the few places that highlights Welsh identity in London.
