= List of UK Parliament constituencies in Powys =

Powys is divided into two constituencies of the House of Commons of the UK Parliament, which are also used for elections to the Senedd. (Note: County constituencies for the purposes of type of returning officer and level of expenses) The current boundaries have been effective since the 2007 National Assembly for Wales election and the 2010 UK general election.

Powys is one of the eight preserved counties of Wales, and has the name and boundaries of one of the 22 principal areas.

For Senedd elections, constituencies are grouped into additional member electoral regions, and changes to constituency boundaries mean, also, changes to regional boundaries.

== Westminster boundaries ==
=== From 2024 ===
- Brecon, Radnor and Cwm Tawe
- Montgomeryshire and Glyndŵr

=== 2010 to 2024 ===
Constituency	Boundaries
1. Brecon and Radnorshire CC (Westminster)	Parliamentary constituencies in Powys 2010
2. Montgomeryshire CC (Westminster)	Parliamentary constituencies in Powys 2010

Conservative † Liberal Democrat ¤

Constituency	Electorate	Majority	Member of Parliament	Nearest opposition	Map reference above
Brecon and Radnorshire	55,490	7,131	Fay Jones †	Jane Dodds ¤	1
Montgomeryshire	48,997	12,138	Craig Williams †	Kishan Devani ¤	2

=== 1997 to 2010 ===
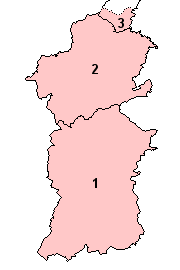
Constituency	Boundaries
1. Brecon and Radnorshire CC (Westminster)	Parliamentary constituencies in Powys pre-2010
2. Montgomeryshire CC (Westminster)	Parliamentary constituencies in Powys pre-2010
3. Clwyd South CC (Westminster) (part)	Parliamentary constituencies in Powys pre-2010

The Clwyd South constituency was also partly a Clwyd constituency.

== Proposed boundary changes ==
The Boundary Commission for Wales submitted their final proposals in respect of the Sixth Periodic Review of Westminster Constituencies (the 2018 review) in September 2018. Although the proposals were immediately laid before Parliament they were not brought forward by the Government for approval. Accordingly, they did not come into effect for the 2019 election which took place on 12 December 2019, and which was contested using the constituency boundaries in place since 2010.

Under the terms of the Parliamentary Voting System and Constituencies Act 2011, the Sixth Review was based on reducing the total number of MPs from 650 to 600 and a strict electoral parity requirement that the electorate of all constituencies should be within a range of 5% either side of the electoral quota.

On 24 March 2020, the Minister of State for the Cabinet Office, Chloe Smith, issued a written statement to Parliament setting out the Government's thinking with regard to parliamentary boundaries. They propose to bring forward primary legislation to remove the statutory obligation to implement the 2018 Boundary Review recommendations, as well as set the framework for future boundary reviews in time for the next review which is due to begin in early 2021 and report no later than October 2023. It is proposed that the number of constituencies now remains at the current level of 650, rather than being reduced to 600, while retaining the requirement that the electorate should be no more than +/- 5% from the electoral quota.

== Senedd boundaries ==
=== From 2007 ===
Constituency	Senedd region	Constituency boundaries
1. Brecon and Radnorshire CC (Senedd)	Mid and West Wales	Senedd constituencies in Powys 2007
2. Montgomeryshire CC (Senedd)	Mid and West Wales	Senedd constituencies in Powys 2007

The Mid and West Wales region also includes five Dyfed constituencies and one Gwynedd constituency.

=== 1999 to 2007 ===
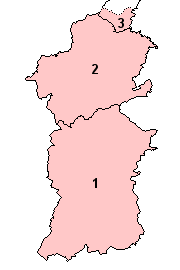
Constituency	Senedd region	Constituency boundaries
1. Brecon and Radnorshire CC (Senedd)	Mid and West Wales	Assembly constituencies in Powys pre-2007
2. Montgomeryshire CC (Senedd)	Mid and West Wales	Assembly constituencies in Powys pre-2007
3. Clwyd South CC (Senedd) (part)	North Wales	Assembly constituencies in Powys pre-2007

== Results ==
=== Westminster elections ===
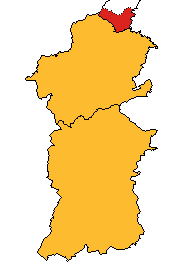
2005

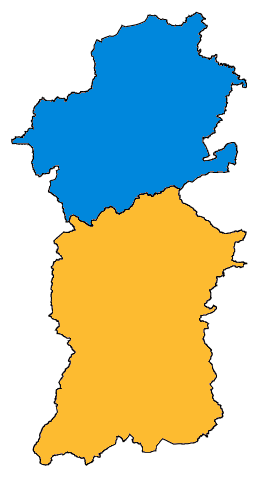
2010

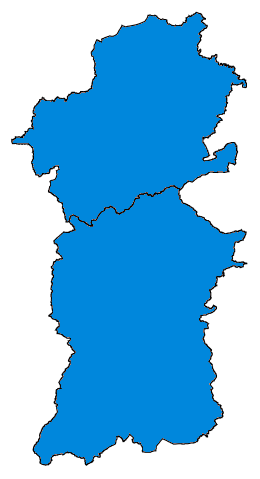
2015

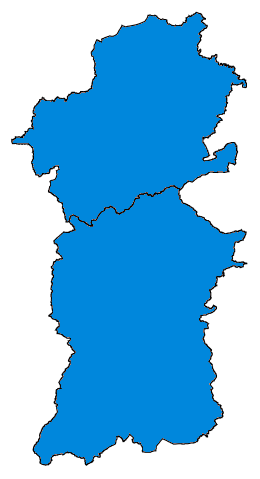
2017

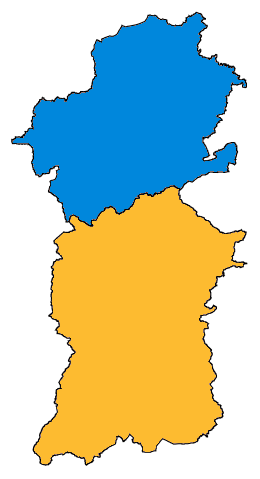
2019 (Aug)

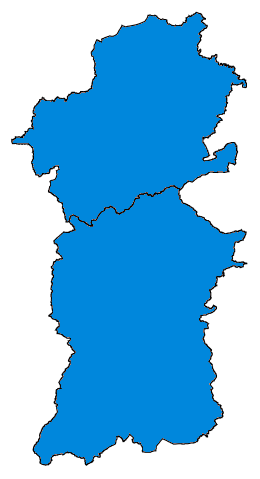
2019 (Dec)

=== Assembly/Senedd elections ===
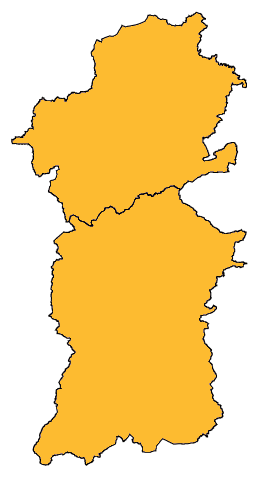
2007

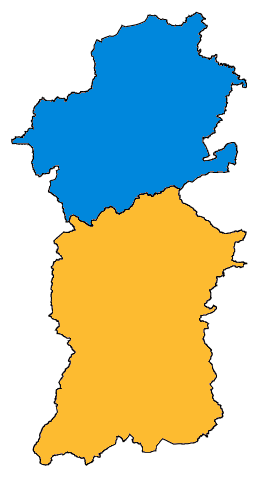
2011

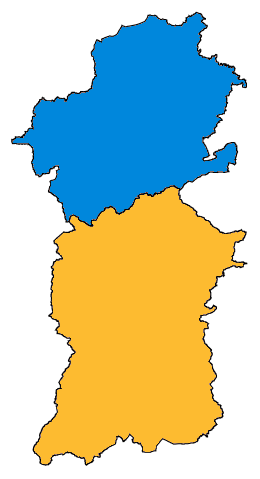
2016

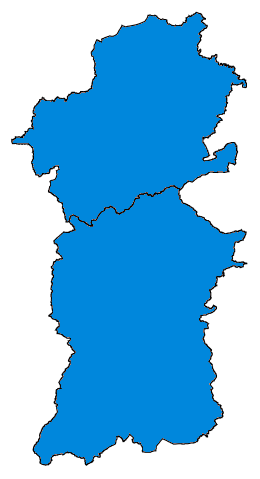
2021

== Historical representation by party ==
A cell marked → (with a different colour background to the preceding cell) indicates that the previous MP continued to sit under a new party name.

=== 1832 to 1859 ===
Conservative Peelite Whig

Constituency	1832	33	1835	1837	40	1841	1847	50	1852	54	55	1857	58
Montgomery Boroughs	Pugh	Edwards				Cholmondeley	Pugh						
Montgomeryshire	C. Williams-Wynn							H. Williams-Wynn					
Radnor Boroughs	Price						T. Lewis				G. Lewis		
Radnorshire	T. Lewis		Wilkins		J. Walsh								
Brecon	Watkins		C. M. Morgan				Watkins		C. R. Morgan	Watkins			
Breconshire	Wood						Bailey						G. Morgan

=== 1859 to 1885 ===
Conservative Liberal

Constituency	1859	61	62	63	1865	66	1868	69	70	1874	75	77	1880	84
Montgomery Boroughs	Pugh	Willes-Johnson		C. Hanbury-Tracy								F. Hanbury-Tracy		
Montgomeryshire	H. Williams-Wynn		C. Williams-Wynn jnr										Rendel	
Radnor Boroughs	G. Lewis			Green-Price				Cavendish					Williams	Coltman-Rogers
Radnorshire	J. Walsh						A. Walsh						Green-Price	
Brecon	Watkins					Gwyn^{1}		Villiers	Gwynne-Holford				Flower	
Breconshire	G. Morgan										Fuller-Maitland			

^{1} original victor Pratt (Liberal) declared void on petition

=== 1885 to 1918 ===
Conservative Liberal

Constituency	1885	1886	1892	94	1895	1900	1906	Jan 1910	Dec 1910
Montgomery District	P. Pryce-Jones	Hanbury-Tracy	P. Pryce-Jones		E. Pryce-Jones		Rees		E. Pryce-Jones
Montgomeryshire	Rendel			Humphreys-Owen			Davies		
Radnorshire	Walsh		Edwards		Milbank	Edwards		Dillwyn-Venables-Llewellyn	Edwards
Breconshire	Fuller-Maitland				Morley		Robinson		

=== 1918 to 1950 ===
Coalition Liberal (1918–22) / National Liberal (1922–23) Conservative Independent Labour Liberal National Government National Liberal (1931–68)

Constituency	1918	1922	1923	1924	1929	31	1931	1935	39	42	1945
Montgomeryshire	D. Davies				C. Davies	→			→	→	
Brecon and Radnor	Robinson	Jenkins	→	Hall	Freeman		Hall	Guest	Jackson		Watkins

=== 1950 to 1997 ===
Conservative Labour Liberal Liberal Democrats

Constituency	1950	1951	1955	1959	62	1964	1966	1970	Feb 74	Oct 74	1979	1983	85	1987	88	1992
Montgomeryshire	C. Davies				Hooson						Williams	Carlile			→	
Brecon and Radnor / B & R'shire ('83)	Watkins							Roderick			Hooson		Livsey		→	Evans

=== 1997 to present ===
Conservative Labour Liberal Democrats

Constituency	1997	2001	2005	2010	2015	2017	19	2019	2024
Montgomeryshire / Montgomeryshire & Glyndwr (2024)	Öpik			G. Davies				C. Williams	Witherden
Brecon & Radnorshire / Brecon, Radnor & Cwm Tawe (2024)	Livsey	R. Williams			C. Davies		Dodds	Jones	Chadwick

== See also ==
- List of parliamentary constituencies in Wales
