= Wynne Cemlyn-Jones =

Welsh Liberal Party politician

Captain Sir Elias Wynne Cemlyn-Jones MBE (16 May 1888 – 6 June 1966), known as Wynne Cemlyn-Jones, was a Welsh Liberal Party politician.

== Background ==
He was the son of Anglesey farmer John Cemlyn-Jones of Brynbella, Penmaenmawr. He was educated at Shrewsbury School. In 1914, he married Muriel Gwendolin Owen. They had two sons and two daughters. His wife died in 1930.

== Professional career ==
In 1912, he became Private Secretary to Anglesey's Liberal MP Sir Ellis Griffith, when he was appointed Under-Secretary of State for the Home Department. He supported Griffith in his task of steering the Welsh Disestablishment Bill through the House of Commons. He was admitted to the Middle Temple on 16 July 1913. In 1914, after the bill was passed and war broke out, he signed up to serve in the Royal Welch Fusiliers. He was Called to the Bar at Middle Temple on 17 November 1919 and was appointed a Member of the Order of the British Empire in the 1919 New Year Honours.

== Political career ==
His first introduction to politics had come from working for his local Liberal MP, Sir Ellis Griffith. He got involved in civic affairs on Anglesey. In 1919 he was elected to Anglesey County Council. He served on this body as a Councillor, until he was appointed to it as an Alderman in 1928. He was Liberal candidate for the Unionist seat of South Croydon at the 1923 General Election. It was not a promising seat for the Liberals, whose candidate had polled 25.2% in 1922, finishing third. He was unable to advance the Liberal position;

1923 General Election Electorate 49,634
Party	Candidate	Votes	%	±%
Unionist	Sir William Lowson Mitchell-Thomson	14,310	45.5	−1.8
Labour	Henry Thomas Muggeridge	9,926	31.6	+4.1
Liberal	Elias Wynne Cemlyn-Jones	7,208	25.2	−2.3
Majority		4,384	13.9	−5.9
Turnout			63.4	−3.0
Unionist hold		Swing	-3.0	

He did not contest the 1924 General Election, when the South Croydon seat became a 2-way contest between Unionist and Labour. He became Chairman of Anglesey County Council. He was Liberal candidate for the Brecon & Radnor division at the 1929 General Election. This was a far better prospect as the Liberals had held the seat up until the 1924 General Election when they narrowly lost the seat to the Unionists in a close three-way battle, with Labour third. He managed to increase the Liberal share of the vote, but Labour came through to take the seat from third place;

General Election 1929 Electorate 49,031
Party	Candidate	Votes	%	±%
Labour	Peter Freeman	14,551	33.7	+3.2
Unionist	Walter D'Arcy Hall	14,324	33.3	−5.1
Liberal	Elias Wynne Cemlyn-Jones	14,182	33.0	+1.9
Majority		187	0.4	7.7
Turnout			87.7	
Labour gain from Unionist		Swing	+4.1	

He did not stand for parliament again. He was Chairman of the Selection Committee of Anglesey County Council. He was vice-president of County Councils Association. He was knighted in the 1941 New Year Honours, for public services in Anglesey. He represented the County Councils Association on the Nurses Salaries Committee chaired by Lord Rushcliffe which published two reports in 1943.

He died at Llandudno Hospital in Wales, age 79.
