= 1939 Brecon and Radnorshire by-election =

UK parliamentary by-election

The 1939 Brecon and Radnorshire by-election, was a parliamentary by-election held on 1 August 1939 for the British House of Commons constituency of Brecon and Radnorshire, in South Wales.

== Vacancy ==
The by-election was caused by the sitting member, Ivor Guest, succeeding to a title that gave him a seat in the House of Lords. He had been MP for the constituency since winning the seat in 1935.

== Election history ==
Ivor Guest was elected as a National Government candidate, supported by both local Conservative and Liberal Associations. Guest came from a political family that had in the past had a foot in both party camps, so his selection had been a natural choice. The local Liberal Association had not put forward a candidate for election since the 1929 general election and last won the seat in 1923. The Conservatives had won the seat in 1931, and the Labour party won the seat in 1929. When all three parties had fielded candidates, the election had been a close three-way contest. The result at the last General election was:

General election 1935: Brecon and Radnor
Party	Candidate	Votes	%	±%
National	Ivor Guest	22,079	52.6	N/A
Labour	Leslie Haden-Guest	19,910	47.4	+7.2
Majority		2,169	5.2	N/A
Turnout		41,989	84.3	−2.8
Registered electors		49,827		
National hold		Swing		

== Candidates ==
The local Conservative and Liberal parties could not agree on a joint candidate to succeed Guest as MP. The Conservatives wanted Hanning Philipps, and put him forward as candidate without consulting the Liberals. As a result, the local Liberal Association, which was affiliated to Sir John Simon's Liberal National organisation, formally decided to take no part in the by-election campaign. Philipps was the 35-year-old Eton-educated second son of Lord Milford. The local Labour party needed to find a new candidate, as their last, Leslie Haden Guest, had been elected in a 1937 by-election in the London constituency of Islington North. They chose as their new candidate, William Jackson, who was a farmer from the neighbouring Hereford constituency. Jackson had been a Liberal up until 1931, and was thus a more attractive option to Liberal voters than the Conservative Philipps.

== Main Issues and Campaign ==
The nature of the constituency meant that issues relating to agriculture would be foremost in the campaign. This placed the Labour campaign at an advantage as Jackson was a farmer and Hanning Philipps admitted at his adoption meeting that he knew nothing about farming. Jackson concentrated his campaign on the policy of guaranteed prices for farmers. The absence of a Liberal candidate also allowed the Jackson campaign to appeal to those who favoured a Popular Front opposition to the Government that had been advocated by the likes of Sir Stafford Cripps.

== Result ==
The Labour party gained the seat from the National Government.

1939 Brecon and Radnorshire by-election
Party	Candidate	Votes	%	±%
Labour	William Jackson	20,679	53.4	+6.0
Conservative	Richard Hanning Philipps	18,043	46.6	N/A
Majority		2,636	6.8	N/A
Turnout		38,722	79.9	−4.4
Registered electors		48,486		
Labour gain from National		Swing		

This was the last by-election to take place before the outbreak of war, and the last to take place for nearly two months as Prime Minister Neville Chamberlain toyed with the idea of calling a General Election.

== Aftermath ==
The loss of Brecon and Radnorshire for the National Government would have contributed to Chamberlain's decision not to call a General Election for the Autumn. William Jackson chose not to defend his seat at the 1945 general election and instead accepted a seat in the House of Lords. The local Conservatives, more mindful of the concerns of the local Liberals, chose as their candidate, another member of the Guest family, who had previously sat in the House of Commons as a Liberal. However, by now, the local Liberal Association had ceased being supporters of the National Government and put up their own candidate.

General election 1945: Brecon and Radnor
Party	Candidate	Votes	%	±%
Labour	Tudor Watkins	19,725	46.8	−0.6
Conservative	Oscar Guest	14,089	33.4	N/A
Liberal	David Lewis	8,335	19.8	N/A
Majority		5,636	13.4	N/A
Turnout		42,149	80.0	−4.3
Registered electors		52,689		
Labour hold		Swing	N/A	

== See also ==
- 2019 Brecon and Radnorshire by-election
- 1985 Brecon and Radnor by-election
- Brecon and Radnorshire constituency
- List of United Kingdom by-elections
- United Kingdom by-election records
