= Sir Francis Edwards, 1st Baronet =

British politician (1852–1927)

Sir Francis Edwards DL JP
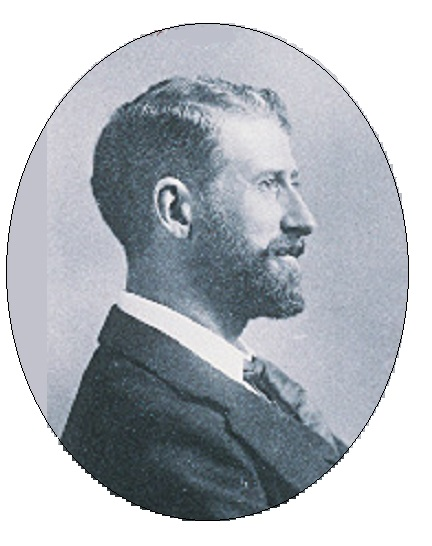
- Edwards in 1906

Member of Parliament for Radnorshire
- In office 19 December 1910 – 14 December 1918
- Preceded by: Charles Dillwyn-Venables-Llewelyn
- Succeeded by: Constituency abolished
- In office 24 October 1900 – 10 February 1910
- Preceded by: Powlett Milbank
- Succeeded by: Charles Dillwyn-Venables-Llewelyn
- In office 26 July 1892 – 7 August 1895
- Preceded by: Arthur Walsh
- Succeeded by: Powlett Milbank

Personal details
- Born: Francis Edwards; 28 April 1852
- Died: 10 May 1927 (aged 75)
- Party: Liberal
- Spouse: Catherine Davis
- Children: 1
- Education: Shrewsbury School
- Alma mater: Jesus College, Oxford

Sir Francis Edwards, 1st Baronet (28 April 1852 – 10 May 1927), commonly known as Frank Edwards, was a British Liberal Party politician.

== Background ==
Sir Francis, the fourth son of Edward Edwards of Llangollen, was educated at Shrewsbury School and Jesus College, Oxford (graduated 1875). He was married in 1880 to Catherine, daughter of David Davis of Aberdare; the couple had one daughter.

== Political career ==
He was elected Liberal Member of Parliament for Radnorshire in 1892. Edwards was a determined Liberal and a supporter of the Disestablishment of the Church in Wales, of which he was a member. In 1894, Edwards joined with David Lloyd George, David Alfred Thomas, and Herbert Lewis in resigning the Liberal Whip in protest at the delay of the Government of Lord Rosebery in introducing a Welsh Disestablishment measure. He was a relative of A. G. Edwards, Bishop of St Asaph and first Archbishop of Wales.

Defeated in 1895, Edwards was to play no part in the struggle to unite Welsh Liberalism under the auspices of Cymru Fydd. Edwards appears to have been viewed as under the 'baleful' influence of David Alfred Thomas by Lloyd George and Herbert Lewis. In 1898, he was High Sheriff of the county. In 1900, Edwards fought Radnorshire on a platform of opposition to the Boer War and returned to parliament.

He was created baronet of Knighton in the County of Radnor on 25 July 1907.

Escutcheon of the Edwards baronets of Knighton

Edwards published a volume of Welsh poetry entitled 'Translations from the Welsh' in 1913. He did not stand in 1918, the Radnorshire Constituency having been amalgamated with Brecon.

He served as Justice of the Peace and Deputy Lieutenant for Radnorshire.

=== Elections contested ===
==== UK Parliament elections ====
Date of election	Constituency	Party	Votes	%	Result
1892	Radnorshire	Liberal	1,973	53.1	Elected
1895	Radnorshire	Liberal	1,870	49.0	Not Elected (2nd)
1900	Radnorshire	Liberal	2,082	52.1	Elected
1906	Radnorshire	Liberal	2,187	52.1	Elected
1910 (Jan)	Radnorshire	Liberal	2,208	49.8	Not Elected (2nd)
1910 (Dec)	Radnorshire	Liberal	2,224	50.5	Elected

Parliament of the United Kingdom
Preceded by Arthur Walsh	Member of Parliament for Radnorshire; 1892–1895	Succeeded by Powlett Milbank
Preceded by Powlett Milbank	Member of Parliament for Radnorshire; 1900 – January 1910	Succeeded by Charles Dillwyn-Venables-Llewelyn
Preceded by Charles Dillwyn-Venables-Llewelyn	Member of Parliament for Radnorshire; December 1910 – 1918	Succeeded by Sidney Robinson (for Brecon & Radnor)
Baronetage of the United Kingdom
New creation	Baronet (of Knighton); 1907–1927	Extinct
Preceded by Bowring baronets	Edwards baronets of Knighton; 25 July 1907	Succeeded by Philipson-Stow baronets
