= Ivor Guest, 3rd Viscount Wimborne =

Ivor Fox-Strangways Guest, 3rd Viscount Wimborne
- Born: 2 December 1939; Colchester, England
- Died: 17 December 1993 (aged 54)
- Occupation: peer
- Spouse(s): Victoria Ann Vigors, Venetia Margaret Barke
- Children: Ivor Guest, 4th Viscount Wimborne, Ilona Charlotte Guest
- Parent(s): Ivor Grosvenor Guest, 2nd Viscount Wimborne, Lady Mabel Edith Fox-Strangways

Ivor Fox-Strangways Guest, 3rd Viscount Wimborne (2 December 1939 – 17 December 1993) was a British peer.

== Early life ==
Ivor Fox-Strangways Guest was born on 2 December 1939. He was the son of Ivor Grosvenor Guest, 2nd Viscount Wimborne (1903–1967) and his wife Lady Mabel Edith Fox-Strangways, a daughter of Giles Fox-Strangways, 6th Earl of Ilchester. William Walton composed "Set me as a seal upon thine heart" for his parents' wedding.

His paternal grandfather was Ivor Guest, 1st Viscount Wimborne (1873–1939), who was a British politician and one of the last Lords Lieutenant of Ireland, serving in that position at the time of the Easter Rising in 1916. He was educated at Eton College, like his father.

== Personal life ==
He was married twice. The first was on 20 December 1966, when he married Victoria Ann Vigors. Together they had:

- Ivor Mervyn Vigors Guest, 4th Viscount Wimborne (born 1968), who married Ieva Imsa.

He later married Venetia Margaret Barker (nee Quarry); his sister-in-law was Miranda Macmillan, Countess of Stockton (1947–2020). Together, they had:

- Ilona Charlotte Guest (born 1985), who married Oliver Hilton-Johnson in 2012.

His widow, now Dowager Viscountess Wimborne, lives at Fontaine-l'Abbé, France.

Peerage of the United Kingdom
Preceded by Ivor Guest	Viscount Wimborne; 1967–1993	Succeeded by Ivor Mervyn Vigors Guest
