= 1910 New Year Honours =

Appointments by King Edward VII to various orders and honours

The New Year Honours 1910 were appointments by King Edward VII to various orders and honours to reward and highlight good works by members of the British Empire. They were announced on 4 January 1910.

== Order of the Star of India ==
=== Knight Grand Commander (GCSI) ===
- Her Highness Nawab Sultan Jahan Begam, G.C.I.E., Begam of Bhopal.
- His Highness Raj Rajeshwar Maharajadhiraja Sir Sardar Singh Bahadur, K.C.S.I., Maharaja of Jodhpur in Rajputana.

=== Knight Commander (KCSI) ===
- Sir James Lyle Mackay, G.C.M.G., K.C.I.E., a Member of the Council of His Majesty's Secretary of State for India.
- Sir Harvey Adamson, C.S.I, Indian Civil Service, an Ordinary Member of the Council of the Governor-General of India.
- Lieutenant-General Sir Beauchamp Duff, K.C.B., K.C.V.O., C.I.E., Indian Army, Secretary in the Military Department, India Office.
- Ihtisham-ul-Mulk Rais-ud-Daula Amir-ul-Omrah Nawab Asif Kadr Saiyid Wasif Ali Mirza Khan Bahadur, Mahabat Jang, Nawab Bahadur of Murshidabad, Member of the Council of the Lieutenant-Governor of Bengal for making Laws and Regulations.
- Lieutenant-Colonel James Robert Dunlop Smith, C.S.I., C.I.E., Indian Army, Private Secretary to His Excellency the Viceroy and Governor-General of India.

=== Companion (CSI) ===
- Commander Sir Hamilton Pym Freer-Smith, R.N. (Retired).
- Benjamin Robertson, Esq., C.I.E., Indian Civil Service, Secretary to the Government of India in the Department of Commerce and Industry.
- Andrew Edmund Castlestuart Stuart, Esq., Indian Civil Service, Member of the Board of Revenue, Madras, and an Additional Member of the Council of the Governor of Madras for making Laws and Regulations.
- Colonel (temporary Brigadier-General) William Riddell Birdwood, C.I.E., D.S.O,. A.D.C., Indian Army, Colonel on the Staff, Kohat Brigade.
- Norman Goodford Cholmeley, Esq., Indian Civil Service, Commissioner of a Division in Burma, on deputation under the Government of India.

== Order of the Indian Empire ==
=== Knight Commander (KCIE) ===
- Theodore Morison, Esq., a Member of the Council of His Majesty's Secretary of State for India.

=== Companion (CIE) ===
- James Bennett Brunyate, Esq., Indian Civil Service, Secretary to the Government of India in the Finance Department (Military Finance).
- Frederick James Wilson, Esq., M.I C.E., Secretary to the Government of Madras, Public Works Department, and an Additional Member of the Council of the Governor of Madras for making Laws and Regulations.
- Henry Wheeler, Esq., Indian Civil Service, Secretary to the Government of Bengal, Financial and Municipal Departments, and a Member of the Council of the Lieutenant-Governor for making Laws and Regulations.
- Reginald Edward Enthoven, Esq., Indian Civil Service, Secretary to the Government of Bombay, General, Educational, Marine, and Ecclesiastical Departments.
- Colonel Wilfrid Malleson, Indian Army, Assistant Quartermaster-General, Division of the Chief of the Staff.
- Henry Venn Cobb, Esq., Indian Civil Service, Resident at Baroda.
- Reginald Hugh Brereton, Esq., Indian Civil Service, late Inspector-General of Police, United Provinces of Agra and Oudh.
- Rai Bahadur Nrittya Gopal Basil, Assistant Comptroller-General.
- James Macdonald Law, Esq., Deputy Inspector-General of Police, Burma,
- William Lochiel Berkeley Souter, Esq., Deputy Inspector-General of Police, Bombay.
- Prabashanker Pattani, Esq., Dewan of Bhavnagar.

== Royal Victorian Order ==
=== Commander (CVO) ===
- The Honourable Arthur Henry John Walsh, M.V.O., Master of the Ceremonies to His Majesty the King.

=== Member, 4th Class ===
- Colonel John Morrison, commanding 5th (Sutherland and Caithness Highland Battalion) Seaforth Highlanders.
