= 2019 Brecon and Radnorshire by-election =

UK parliamentary by-election

- 1 August 2019

Brecon and Radnorshire constituency
- Registered: 53,393
- Turnout: 59.7% ▼17.2 pp
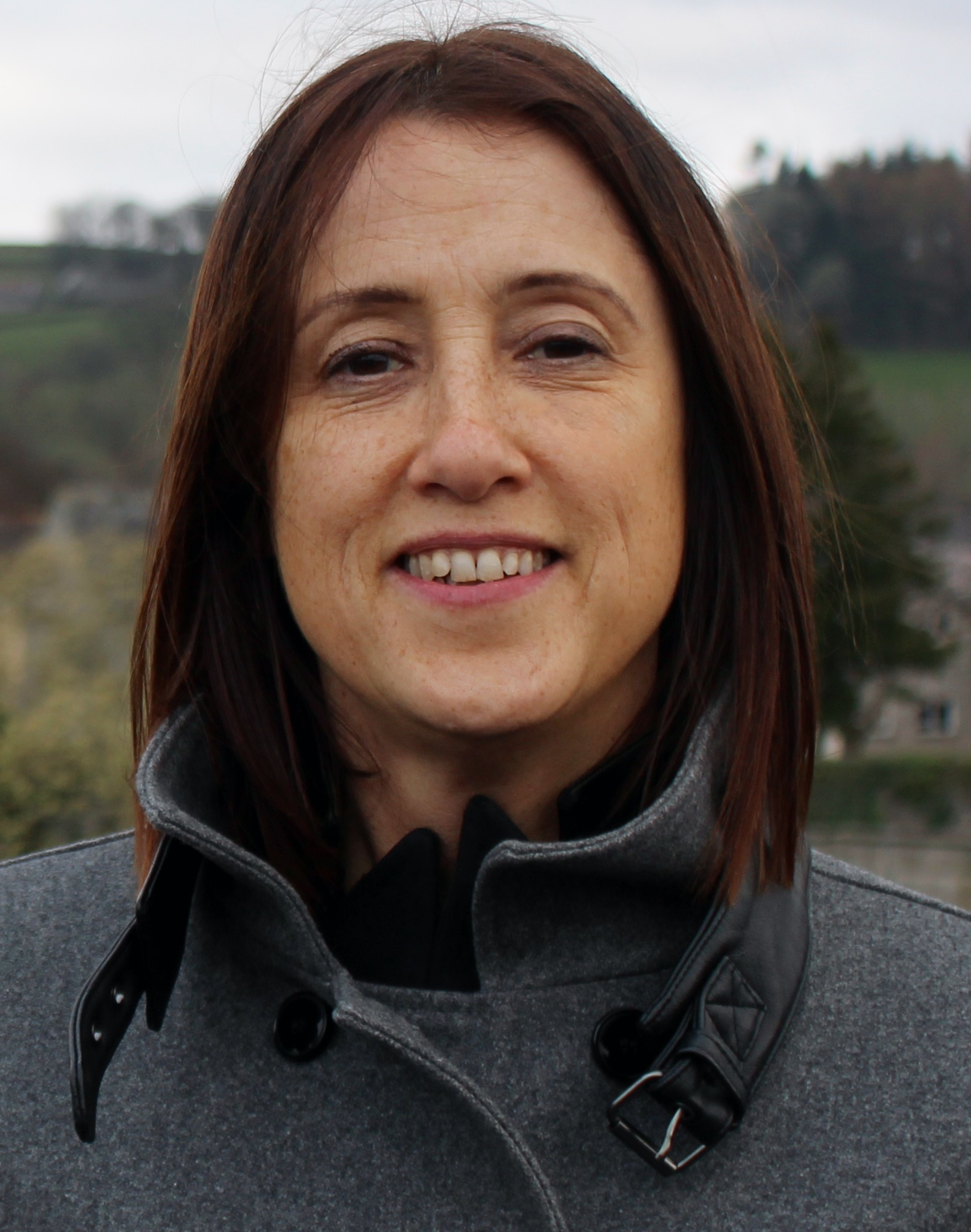

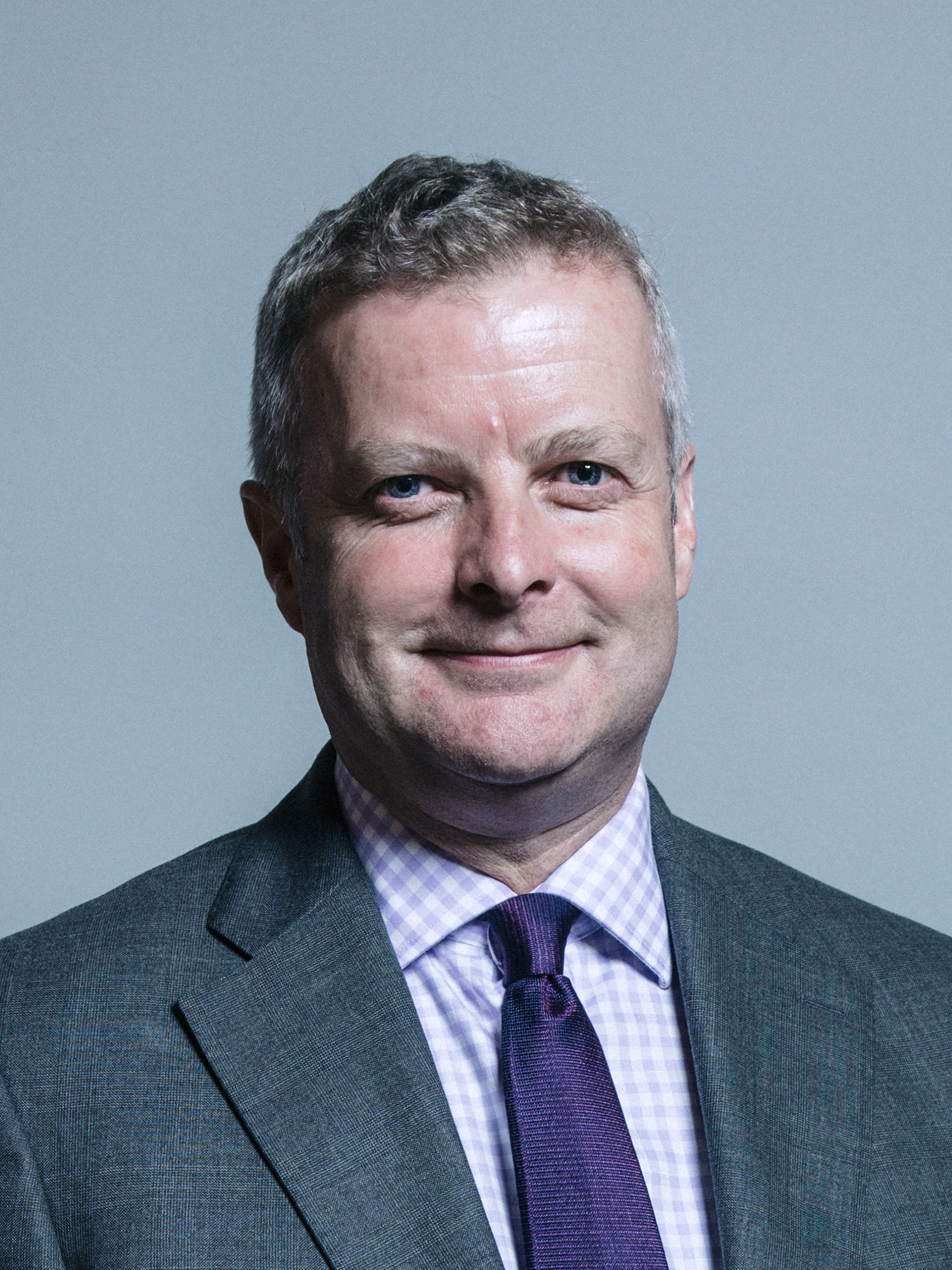
	First party	Second party
Candidate	Jane Dodds	Chris Davies
Party	Liberal Democrats	Conservative
Popular vote	13,826	12,401
Percentage	43.5%	39.0%
Swing	▲14.4 pp	▼9.6 pp
	Third party	Fourth party
Candidate	Des Parkinson	Tom Davies
Party	Brexit Party	Labour
Popular vote	3,331	1,680
Percentage	10.5%	5.3%
Swing	N/a	▼12.4 pp
MP before election
Chris Davies
Conservative
Elected MP
Jane Dodds
Liberal Democrats

A by-election for the United Kingdom parliamentary constituency of Brecon and Radnorshire was held on 1 August 2019 after incumbent Conservative Party MP Chris Davies was unseated by a successful recall petition following a conviction for false expenses claims. The by-election was won by Jane Dodds of the Liberal Democrats, denying Davies re-election, but the seat fell to the Conservatives at the following general election four months later.

== Background ==
Richard Livsey, a Liberal standing for the SDP–Liberal Alliance, won the seat in the 1985 Brecon and Radnor by-election and retained it in 1987. He lost it narrowly as a Liberal Democrat MP to the Conservative Jonathan Evans in the 1992 general election. The Liberal Democrats regained the seat in the 1997 election and held it until 2015, when Chris Davies won it for the Conservatives. Davies retained his seat at the 2017 general election with an increased majority of 8,038 over the Liberal Democrat candidate.

A seat with the same name and boundaries exists in the Welsh Assembly. At the time of the by-election, the seat had been represented by Liberal Democrat Kirsty Williams continuously from its creation in 1999.

In February 2019, Davies was charged with claiming false expenses, pursuant to the Parliamentary Standards Act 2009. He pleaded guilty in March and, in April, was sentenced to a community order of 50 hours unpaid work and a £1,500 fine. Under the Recall of MPs Act 2015, this conviction triggered a recall petition. After receiving notice from the sentencing court, the Speaker of the House of Commons indicated on 24 April 2019 that he would be instructing the constituency's petition officer to begin the recall process. The petition opened on 9 May and remained open for signatures until 20 June 2019. It required 5,303 signatures (10% of eligible voters) to be successful. The Conservative Party were officially registered as campaigners for the petition's failure, while the Liberal Democrats, Labour and Plaid Cymru campaigned for its success.

This petition was successful, receiving 10,005 signatures (19%), significantly in excess of the 10% of constituents required. Davies was removed from the seat, creating a vacancy to be filled at a by-election, in which he was permitted to stand.

The by-election occurred shortly after Boris Johnson won the 2019 Conservative leadership election and became Prime Minister, as well as Jo Swinson taking office after winning the 2019 Liberal Democrats leadership election. The result reduced the working majority of the government (including confidence and supply from the DUP) in the House of Commons to one. (Note: Calculations of the government's majority vary slightly. This value considers Charlie Elphicke, who had the Conservative whip withdrawn on 22 July 2019, to be an opposition MP) This makes him the PM to serve the shortest period before losing a by-election, just 10 days.

The by-election came against the continuing backdrop of Brexit. The constituency lies within the county of Powys, where, at the 2019 European Parliament election, the Brexit Party gained the most votes.

It was the first Westminster by-election to take place in the month of August since the second Fermanagh and South Tyrone by-election of 1981. It is to date the last Westminster by-election to be held in Wales.

== Candidates and campaign ==
The by-election was administered by Powys County Council. The deadline for candidate nominations was 5 July, by which time a total of six candidates had registered.

Davies wished to stand for re-election as the Conservative Party candidate and was chosen by the local party. The Liberal Democrat candidate was Jane Dodds, the leader of the Welsh Liberal Democrats. The Labour Party candidate was Brecon town councillor Tom Davies. The Brexit Party candidate was retired police chief superintendent Des Parkinson, who previously stood in Montgomeryshire as a UK Independence Party (UKIP) candidate for election to the UK parliament in May 2015, to the Welsh Assembly in May 2016, and as Dyfed-Powys Police and Crime Commissioner, also in May 2016.

Dodds, the Liberal Democrat candidate, was also supported by Plaid Cymru, the Greens, Change UK and the Renew Party. Plaid Cymru first indicated that it might not stand a candidate in order to support another party supporting a second referendum on Brexit. Change UK called for an independent joint Remain candidate in a letter to the Liberal Democrats, Plaid and the Greens. Plaid and Change UK subsequently confirmed that they were in talks with other Remain-supporting parties. Plaid Cymru decided not to put up a candidate, and instead to support Dodds. The Green Party also chose not to stand a candidate, in order to "maximise the chances of the candidate most likely to beat the Conservatives and the Brexit Party." The Renew Party likewise chose not to stand a candidate for the same reason.

Shortly after the result of the recall petition was announced, bookmakers made the Liberal Democrats odds-on favourites to win. In the final week before the election, Heidi Allen MP, former leader of Change UK and now sitting with The Independents, came to the constituency to campaign for Dodds. The new Liberal Democrat leader, Jo Swinson, visited the constituency four times, but the New Statesman noted that The Brexit Party leader Nigel Farage had not, and described the party's campaign infrastructure as "threadbare".

Days before the election, BBC Cymru Wales reported that, in May 2019, the Conservative Party's Brecon and Radnorshire chairman, Peter Weavers, had discussed a pro-Brexit pact with Nathan Gill, a Welsh Brexit Party MEP. Gill dismissed the idea due to Davies' support for the Withdrawal Agreement negotiated by Theresa May's government. Weavers denied the claim.

== Opinion polling ==
Only one poll was conducted, with fieldwork taking place from 10 to 18 July. The poll was completed before Johnson and Swinson were elected as leaders of the Conservatives and Liberal Democrats respectively. Commenting on the paucity of polling, Britain Elects noted: "Constituency opinion polling isn’t tried much in the UK these days; it’s difficult to get a sample with such a small electorate, and when it was tried on a large scale in advance of the 2015 election it fell victim to the same polling failures that beset that election."

The poll, by Number Cruncher Politics, was the first UK by-election poll to be conducted entirely online.

Pollster/client(s)	Date(s) conducted	Sample size	Con	Lib Dem	Lab	UKIP	Brexit	MRLP	Other	Lead
2019 by-election result	1 Aug 2019	–	39.0%	43.5%	5.3%	0.8%	10.5%	1.1%	0.0%	4.5%
Number Cruncher Politics	10–18 Jul 2019	509	28%	43%	8%	1%	20%	1%	0%	15%
2017 general election	8 Jun 2017	–	48.6%	29.1%	17.7%	1.4%	N/A	N/A	3.1%	19.5%

== Result ==
Bar chart of the election result.

2019 Brecon and Radnorshire by-election
Party	Candidate	Votes	%	±%
Liberal Democrats	Jane Dodds	13,826	43.5	+14.4
Conservative	Christopher Davies	12,401	39.0	–9.6
Brexit Party	Des Parkinson	3,331	10.5	N/A
Labour	Tom Davies	1,680	5.3	–12.4
Monster Raving Loony	Lady Lily the Pink	334	1.1	N/A
UKIP	Liz Phillips	242	0.8	–0.6
Majority		1,425	4.5	N/A
Turnout		31,814	59.6	–17.3
Registered electors		53,393		
Liberal Democrats gain from Conservative		Swing	+12.0	

The result was announced at around 2:20 a.m. on 2 August. In her victory speech, Jane Dodds said she would urge Prime Minister Boris Johnson to "stop playing with the future of our communities and rule out a no-deal Brexit". By failing to secure at least 5% of the votes cast, both the Official Monster Raving Loony Party (1.05%) and the UK Independence Party (0.76%) forfeited their deposits. The 59.6% turnout figure was the highest recorded in a Westminster by-election since Winchester in 1997.

The Liberal Democrat majority was smaller than the number of votes polled by the Brexit Party, leading many commentators to suggest that vote splitting between the Conservatives and the Brexit Party was a significant threat to the party. The Brexit Party did however underperform relative to polls (although they got nearly twice as many votes as the Labour Party and came a clear third), with the BBC suggesting that the appointment of Boris Johnson as Prime Minister had helped the Conservatives win back some Brexit Party supporters. Meanwhile, the narrow win for the Lib Dems bolstered support for a "Remain Alliance", but the largest increase in Lib Dem votes appeared to come from those who voted Labour in 2017. The Guardian noted that although Labour had prioritised beating the Conservatives over winning the seat themselves, Labour's result was still "at the lower end of what was credible". The extremely small vote share for UKIP was reported as an embarrassment for the party, and their failure to beat even the Official Monster Raving Loony Party was compared to the May 1990 Bootle election in which David Owen's continuing Social Democratic Party received fewer votes than the Loonys and collapsed shortly after.

== Previous result ==
General election 2017: Brecon and Radnorshire
Party	Candidate	Votes	%	±%
Conservative	Christopher Davies	20,081	48.6	+7.5
Liberal Democrats	James Gibson-Watt	12,043	29.1	+0.8
Labour	Dan Lodge	7,335	17.7	+3.0
Plaid Cymru	Kate Heneghan	1,299	3.1	–1.3
UKIP	Peter Gilbert	576	1.4	–6.9
Majority		8,038	19.5	+6.7
Turnout		41,334	76.9	+3.1
Registered electors		56,010		
Conservative hold		Swing	+3.4	

== See also ==
- 2021 Chesham and Amersham by-election
- 2019 Peterborough by-election
- 1985 Brecon and Radnor by-election
- 1939 Brecon and Radnorshire by-election
- Lists of United Kingdom by-elections
