= Jane Dodds =

Welsh politician (born 1963)

Jane Dodds MS
- Official portrait, 2026

Leader of the Welsh Liberal Democrats
- In office 3 November 2017 – 16 November 2026
- Deputy: Christine Humphreys; David Chadwick
- Leader: Vince Cable; Jo Swinson; Sal Brinton (interim); Mark Pack (interim); Ed Davey
- Preceded by: Mark Williams (Note: Kirsty Williams acted from 16 June 2017 to 3 November 2017.)
- Succeeded by: David Chadwick

Member of the Senedd
- Incumbent
- Assumed office 6 May 2021
- Preceded by: Multi-member constituency
- Constituency: Mid and West Wales (2021–2026); Brycheiniog Tawe Nedd (2026–present)

Member of Parliament for Brecon and Radnorshire
- In office 1 August 2019 – 6 November 2019
- Preceded by: Chris Davies
- Succeeded by: Fay Jones

Personal details
- Born: Jane Winifred Dodds; 13 September 1963 (age 63) Wrexham, Wales
- Party: Welsh Liberal Democrats (2005–present)
- Other political affiliations: Labour (until 2003)
- Spouse: Patrick Dodds
- Education: Ysgol Morgan Llwyd
- Alma mater: Cardiff University
- Website: Official website

Jane Winifred Dodds (born 13 September 1963) is a Welsh politician who served Leader of the Welsh Liberal Democrats from 2017 to 2026. She served as Member of Parliament (MP) for Brecon and Radnorshire from August to November 2019, and has served as Member of the Senedd (MS) since 2021, representing Brycheiniog Tawe Nedd, and until 2026, Mid and West Wales.

== Early life and career ==
Dodds was born and raised in a Welsh-speaking family in Wrexham, North Wales. She attended Ysgol Morgan Llwyd before studying social care at Cardiff University. After university she trained to become a social worker, and worked for the Salvation Army in Child Protective Services for 27 years before being elected. During this time she also worked in a number of local authorities and for the Children and Family Court Advisory and Support Service, and also at one stage led the Children's Section of the Refugee Council.

== Political career ==
Dodds moved to London in early 2000 and was a member of the Labour Party until 2003. Being a strong opponent of military intervention, she left the party following its decision to take part in the invasion of Iraq in early 2003. In 2005 she joined the Liberal Democrats following a meeting with Susan Kramer – who was at the time the Liberal Democrat MP for Richmond Park – and quickly became active in the local Richmond party.

Dodds stood for Richmond upon Thames London Borough Council for the Liberal Democrats in the 2006 local elections, and was elected as one of three councillors in the North Richmond ward. In 2008 she was appointed as Cabinet Member for Performance in the Lib Dem-run administration, where she was responsible for the performance of the authority and ensuring that residents obtained value for money. She narrowly failed to retain her seat in 2010 by a narrow margin of 19 votes, despite obtaining the highest vote among the three Liberal Democrat candidates.

She also contested a by-election for the same ward in 2012, following the resignation of one of the sitting Conservative councillors. During the by-election she was the victim of false leaflets produced in her name, which were produced to look like official Liberal Democrat literature. She narrowly missed out on re-election by 146 votes.

In November 2012, Dodds returned to Wales and moved to Welshpool to help care for her elderly mother. Early the following year she was selected as the parliamentary candidate for Montgomeryshire, which Alex Carlile and later Lembit Öpik had held for the Liberal Democrats from 1983 to 2010. Dodds contested the seat in both the 2015 and 2017 general elections, as well as the Welsh Assembly constituency of Montgomeryshire in 2016. She came second on all three occasions, the Welsh Conservatives retaining both seats.

Dodds was elected as the Welsh Liberal Democrats Leader in November 2017, defeating Aberaeron Councillor Elizabeth Evans by 13% in an all-member ballot.

=== Member of Parliament (2019) ===
In March 2019, Dodds was selected as the party's Westminster candidate for Brecon and Radnorshire. As candidate for the constituency, Dodds attacked then-Conservative leadership candidate Boris Johnson's comments about immigrant communities where English is allegedly not spoken as a first language, describing Johnson, in Welsh, as out of touch with communities in Wales. Dodds won the by-election on 1 August 2019.

After serving for 97 days, she failed to retain her seat at the general election of 12 December, becoming one of the shortest-serving members at Westminster. The female MPs with the shortest continuous service are Labour's Ruth Dalton in 1929, at 92 days, and the Scottish National Party's Margo MacDonald who subsequently equalled that in 1973–74.

=== Member of the Senedd (2021–present) ===
Official portrait of Dodds as Member of the Senedd, 2021

Dodds led her party into the 2021 Senedd election and gained a seat on the list vote in Mid and West Wales, the only seat in the Senedd to be retained by the party. The seat was only held by 714 votes.

On 17 November 2024, the Leader of the Liberal Democrats, Sir Ed Davey, hinted that Dodds should resign as Leader of the Welsh Lib Dems over her handling of a sexual abuse case when she worked for the Church of England.

In the 2026 Senedd election, following the reforms of the electoral system, Dodds was elected for the Brycheiniog Tawe Nedd constituency. On 12 May 2026, she abstained in the vote for the new First Minister of Wales.

On 20 October 2026, after nine years in the role, Dodds resigned as Welsh Lib Dem leader. In a statement, she said: "Leading the Welsh Liberal Democrats has been the honour of my life. Together we have won councillors across Wales, and used our voice in the Senedd to deliver real change for families, from new funding for childcare to standing up for Wales as a Nation of Sanctuary. After May's election, I've thought hard about what our party needs. Wales needs more than one liberal voice in the Senedd."

== Electoral history ==
=== Westminster elections ===
General election 2019: Brecon and Radnorshire
Party	Candidate	Votes	%	±%
Conservative	Fay Jones	21,958	53.1	+4.5
Liberal Democrats	Jane Dodds	14,827	35.9	+6.8
Labour	Tomos Davies	3,944	9.5	–8.2
Monster Raving Loony	Lady Lily the Pink	345	0.8	N/A
Christian	Jeff Green	245	0.6	N/A
Majority		7,131	17.2	
Turnout		41,319	74.5	+14.8
Registered electors		55,490		
Conservative gain from Liberal Democrats		Swing	+5.6	

2019 Brecon and Radnorshire by-election
Party	Candidate	Votes	%	±%
Liberal Democrats	Jane Dodds	13,826	43.5	+14.4
Conservative	Christopher Davies	12,401	39.0	–9.6
Brexit Party	Des Parkinson	3,331	10.5	N/A
Labour	Tom Davies	1,680	5.3	–12.4
Monster Raving Loony	Lady Lily the Pink	334	1.1	N/A
UKIP	Liz Phillips	242	0.8	–0.6
Majority		1,425	4.5	
Turnout		31,814	59.7	
Liberal Democrats gain from Conservative		Swing	+12.0	

General election 2015: Montgomeryshire
Party	Candidate	Votes	%	±%
Conservative	Glyn Davies	15,204	45.0	+3.7
Liberal Democrats	Jane Dodds	9,879	29.3	−8.5
UKIP	Des Parkinson	3,769	11.2	+7.9
Labour	Martyn Singleton	1,900	5.6	−1.5
Plaid Cymru	Ann Griffith	1,745	5.2	−3.1
Green	Richard Chaloner	1,260	3.7	N/A
Majority		5,325	15.7	+12.2
Turnout		33,757	69.3	−0.1
Registered electors		48,690		
Conservative hold		Swing	+6.2	

== Political positions ==
=== Health ===
Dodds speaking in the Siambr in 2024

In the Senedd, Jane Dodds has been critical of Welsh Labour's running of the NHS, campaigning against long ambulance waiting times, particularly in rural areas such as her own constituency of Mid and West Wales where services are generally poorer than their urban counterparts. Dodds has called for a priority in investment in social care across Wales in order to reduce stress on A&E services and ambulances being backed up because patients cannot be discharged from emergency departments.

Dodds has called for the extension of safe staffing levels for nursing in Wales to cover mental health inpatient wards and community nursing. The original legislation on safe staffing levels for nurses was introduced by former Welsh Liberal Democrat Leader Kirsty Williams in 2016.

Since being elected to the Senedd, Jane Dodds has focused heavily on improving access to dental care in Wales stating that dental care in Wales has "all but collapsed" and that Welsh Labour have allowed a "two-tier system where the well-off can afford to go private and those, who are probably in the highest need, on lower incomes are left waiting in agony for treatment, unable to register for an NHS dentist".

To solve the dentist crisis, Dodds presented a plan calling for a number of measures including: training more dental nurses and hygienists and widening the scale of work they are allowed to carry out; increasing per-capita spending from the current £47 to match the levels of Scotland (£55) and Northern Ireland (£57); setting health board targets for waiting times and appointments and integrating primary dental care more closely with other NHS primary care.

=== Environment ===
Jane Dodds supports action on climate change and has opposed to opening of new coal mines in Wales and has called on the Welsh and UK Government's to prioritise investment in new industries, such as green hydrogen, in former mining communities.

Dodds is supportive of greater investment in offshore wind power in Wales alongside small-scale hydropower and tidal power. She has also called for the cutting of red tape on planning rules for offshore wind in order to boost moves towards a "green industrial revolution".

=== Devolution and electoral reform ===
Dodds supports the greater devolution of powers to Wales and the creation of a federal UK. She also supports the findings of the Silk Commission for the devolution of justice to Wales.

Dodds supports implementing electoral reform across the UK including at Westminster, the Senedd and in local elections. She has supported introducing proportional representation in the Senedd under the Single Transferrable Vote (STV) system. She has criticised Welsh Labour and Plaid Cymru for not backing STV and opting for closed lists under the Senedd reform plans.

=== Foreign policy ===
Jane Dodds opposed and campaigned against Brexit. She has since supported rebuilding economic ties with the EU, restoring freedom of movement and eventually rejoining the single market.

Dodds was against the 2003 invasion of Iraq and left the Labour Party due to its role in the invasion.

Dodds is a supporter of global human rights and has criticised the Welsh Labour Government for engaging with authoritarian regimes, including criticising Welsh Labour Leader Mark Drakeford for being one of the only UK politicians to visit Qatar during the 2022 FIFA World Cup.

Jane Dodds has expressed support for Ukraine following Russia's invasion of the country and has called on the UK Government to continue to arm Ukraine as well as provide financial support, do more to sanction Russia and support Ukrainian refugees in the UK.

=== Rural affairs and agriculture ===
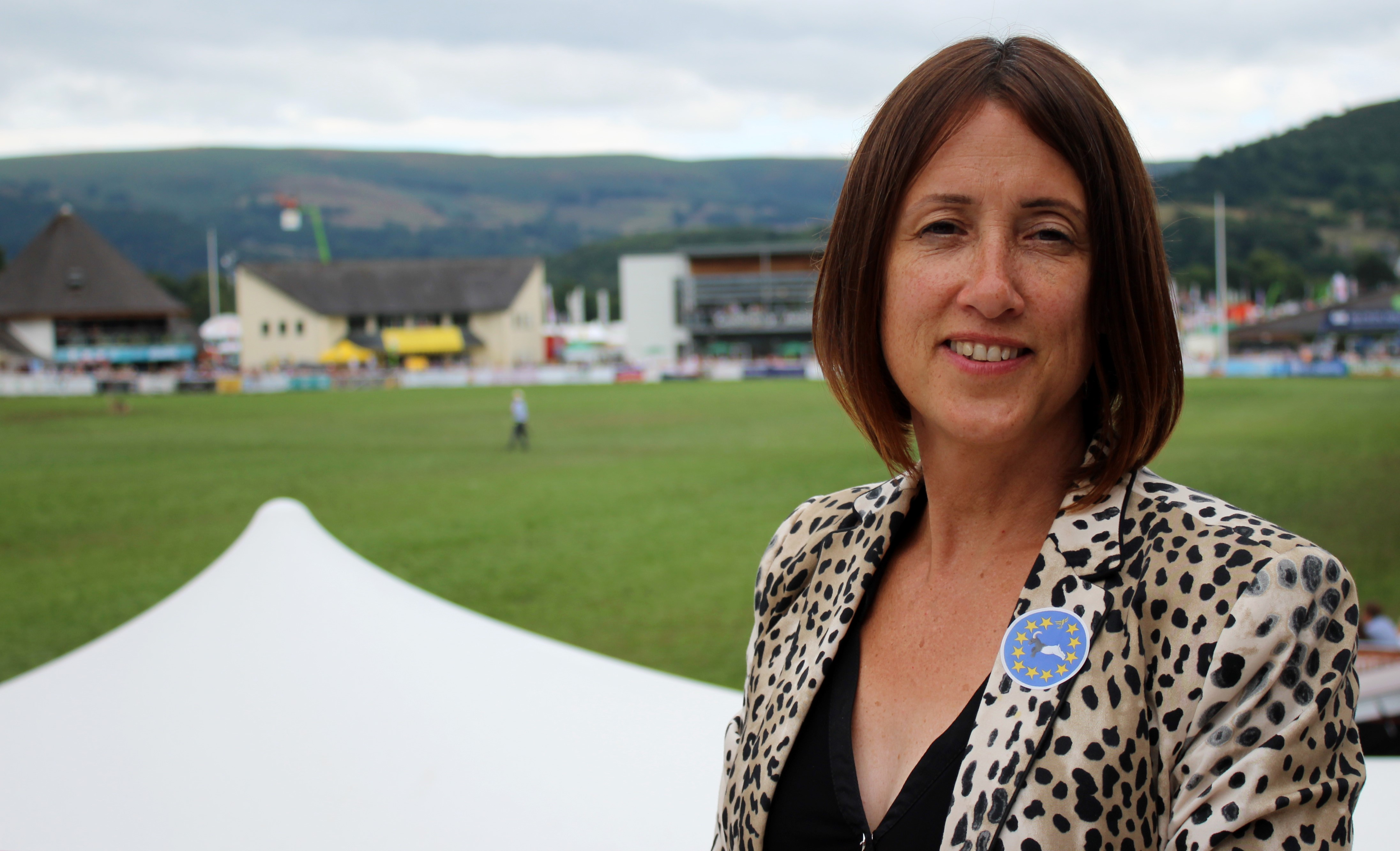
Dodds at the Royal Welsh Show in 2018

Dodds opposed the UK Conservative Government's trade deals with Australia and New Zealand, stating they were one-sided and that the Conservatives had sold Welsh farmers down the river by allowing cheaper products with lower standards into the UK market. She also called for future trade deals to be put to the UK Parliament for a vote and for impact assessments to be carried out on the impact of trade deals for all regions of the UK.

In 2023, Jane Dodds secured a key amendment to the Welsh Agriculture Bill to ensure there is Welsh Government support available to farmers who are looking to establish small-scale renewable energy production on their land and to support the agricultural industry in making changes to increase energy efficiency in their businesses.

=== Transport ===
Dodds has opposed potential cuts by the Welsh Labour Government to bus services in Wales, a move which she has stated would leave rural communities like hers even more isolated. She has also supported the concept of free-travel for under-25s to tackle climate change, increase social mobility and revitalise routes with low ridership. She has also called on the Welsh Government to investigate subsidised public transport, pointing to similar schemes in Spain and Germany.

Jane Dodds has supported proposals to re-open the Aberystwyth-Carmarthen rail line pointing out that it would cost a fraction of the Barnett formula consequentials Wales should in her opinion receive from HS2.

Dodds has campaigned for the introduction of hourly rail services on the Cambrian Line in Montgomeryshire and Ceredigion.

== Mishandling of child sexual abuse case ==
A report published in 2021 found that Dodds had made "a grave error of judgement" by not pursuing a meeting to discuss a particular sexual abuse case involving a late former bishop who sexually abused at least 18 victims over a 15-year period when Dodds worked for the Church of England. This information came to light in November 2024 after the Archbishop of Canterbury Justin Welby resigned over his failure to report prolific child abuser John Smyth.

On 17 November 2024, Dodds said that she would not resign as Welsh Lib Dem leader despite the party's UK leader, Sir Ed Davey, saying that she should consider her position. Davey said he had spoken to Dodds and been “really clear to her about what I think she should do”. She said that she has the confidence of the party's Welsh Board. The Welsh party's President, Tim Sly, has also said that Dodds has its complete confidence.

Dodds said she would "continue fighting for the people of Wales" as the party's Welsh leader and that she "accepted at the time that there were shortcomings in organising meetings about this case" and "acknowledged" them in the report. She stated that child protection is her life's work and wholeheartedly apologised to the victims.

== Personal life ==
She currently lives in Hay-on-Wye with her husband Patrick.

Parliament of the United Kingdom
Preceded by Christopher Davies	Member of Parliament for Brecon and Radnorshire; August–November 2019	Succeeded by Fay Jones
