= Sidney Robinson (British politician) =

British politician

- Robinson, c. 1905

Member of Parliament for Brecon and Radnorshire Breconshire (1906–1918)
- In office 8 February 1906 – 26 October 1922
- Preceded by: Charles Morley
- Succeeded by: William Jenkins

Personal details
- Born: 6 January 1863
- Died: 6 December 1956 (aged 93)
- Party: Liberal (Before 1916, 1923–1956)
- Other political affiliations: Coalition Liberal (1916–1922); National Liberal (1922–1923)
- Spouse: Catherine Flora Grant (m. 1887; died 1935)
- Parent: John Robinson (father)
- Education: Mill Hill School

Sidney Robinson (6 January 1863 – 6 December 1956) was a Liberal Party politician and Timber trader.

== Early life and career ==
He was the fourth son of John Robinson, of Backwell House, Somerset. He was educated at Mill Hill School. He married in 1887, Catherine Flora Grant of Cardiff. She died in 1935.

== Business career ==
In 1880 he moved to Cardiff and worked in the timber trade with Messrs. John Grant & Co. He subsequently bought the company and then became a partner with T.W. David. They renamed the business Robinson, David & Co. He was elected President of the Bristol Channel Timber Importers Association.

== Political career ==
In 1895 he was elected as a Liberal to Cardiff Town Council representing Splott Ward. He stood down from the Council in 1901. He opposed the Conservative Government's Education Bill which drew him back into Cardiff politics. He became President of Cardiff Liberal Association. He was elected to the House of Commons at his first attempt, at the 1906 general election, for the Breconshire constituency. He had been selected in succession to Liberal MP, Charles Morley who had held the seat since 1895.

In 1907 he was appointed as a Justice of the Peace to serve in Glamorgan. He was re-elected at both the January 1910 and December 1910 elections.

From 1911 he served as a Justice of the Peace in Wiltshire and Somerset. For the 1918 General Election there were boundary changes that merged Robinson's Breconshire constituency with the Radnorshire constituency of his Liberal colleague Sir Francis Edwards to form the new Brecon and Radnorshire constituency. Robinson was chosen by the new local Liberal Association to contest the seat and Edwards retired from parliament. Robinson's candidacy was further endorsed by Lloyd George and the Coalition Government, which was enough to deter any other candidate from standing.

With the approach of the 1922 general election, Robinson retired from parliament at the age of 59.

== Personal life ==
Resident in Bath, Somerset, after his retirement from national politics he assumed a number of roles with local charities.

Parliament of the United Kingdom
Preceded by Charles Morley	Member of Parliament for Breconshire; 1906 – 1918	Constituency abolished
New constituency	Member of Parliament for Brecon & Radnor; 1918 – 1922	Succeeded by William Albert Jenkins
