= William Jackson, 1st Baron Jackson =

British fruit farmer and MP

William Frederick Jackson, 1st Baron Jackson (29 November 1893 – 2 May 1954) was a British fruit farmer from Ross-on-Wye in Herefordshire who was noted for his scientific cultivation of a range of fruits. He was a Liberal Party activist who joined the Labour Party, and became the Member of Parliament (MP) for Brecon & Radnor from 1939 to 1945.

== Early life ==
Jackson was born in Birmingham, one of four sons of George Jackson, a justice of the peace from Edgbaston in Birmingham, and his wife Minnie Blay.

He was educated at King Edward's School in Birmingham, and when the First World War broke out he joined the Royal Warwickshire Regiment. He served in France from 1915 to 1916, and was promoted to serjeant and wounded in the Battle of the Somme. His regimental number was 669, showing he was a fairly early recruit. His medal index card shows he entered France on 21 November 1915, which coincides with the arrival of the three Birmingham Pals Battalions raised as part of Kitchener's Army (14th, 15th and 16th Service Battalions, Royal Warwicks), these formed 95th Brigade, in 32nd Division. His service entitled him to the 1914–15 Star, the British War Medal and the Victory Medal; and following his discharge he also received the Silver War Badge to show that he had served. He returned to England as an invalid, and in 1919 he took over the family firms's lands at Glewstone, near Ross-on-Wye in Herefordshire. The farms mostly grew apples, plums and strawberries, on over 400 intensively cultivated acres, and Jackson's scientific approach to farming led to him being treated as an authority on the farming matters both by farming organisations and by government.

== Political career ==
Jackson was active in the Liberal Party in the 1920s, becoming a member of the executive committee of the party's Midlands region. However, when the National Government was formed in 1931 he joined the Labour Party, and was later elected to Herefordshire County Council.

When Ivor Guest, the MP for nearby Brecon & Radnor, succeeded to the peerage as Viscount Wimborne, Jackson was selected as the Labour Party candidate for the resulting by-election in August 1939. The election was a straight fight between Labour and Conservative candidate, but there had been an informal agreement between the local Liberal National Party and the Conservatives that only one of two parties would contest the seat, and the Liberal Nationals were aggrieved that the Conservatives had "jumped their claim" by nominating a candidate. They selected their own candidate, but were persuaded to withdraw to avoid splitting the non-socialist vote and thereby handing the seat to Labour, but the alliance between the two parties was regarded as having been broken, and the outcome of the election depended on the destination of Liberal support.

With his Liberal background and extensive agricultural contacts in the area, Jackson won the seat with a majority of 6.8% of the votes, a 12% swing to Labour. In Parliament, he spoke for small farmers and cultivators, but was not a devoted follower of Labour Party policy; true to the old Liberal principle of free trade, he opposed all restraints on trade and production. He stood down from the House of Commons at the 1945 general election, and was ennobled in July 1945 as Baron Jackson, of Glewstone in the County of Hereford, entitling him to a seat in the House of Lords. The title became extinct on his death in 1954, aged 60.

== Family ==
In 1923 Jackson married Hope Hardy Gilmour, daughter of Benjamin Waterfall Gilmour from Glasgow. They adopted a son, who was unable to inherit the title, which was remaindered to "heirs male of his body", as is usual with British hereditary peerages.

Parliament of the United Kingdom
Preceded by Ivor Guest	Member of Parliament for Brecon & Radnor; 1939 – 1945	Succeeded by Tudor Watkins
Peerage of the United Kingdom
New creation	Baron Jackson; 1945–1954	Extinct
