= William Jenkins (coal merchant) =

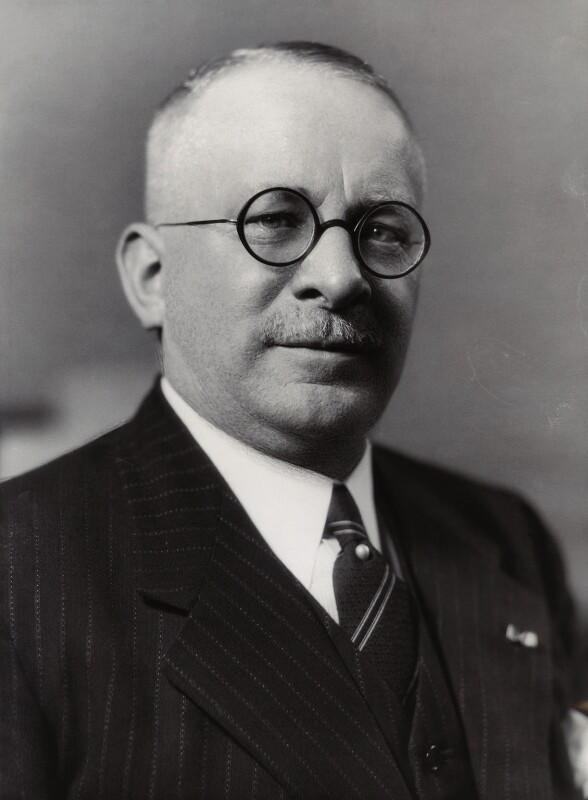
Jenkins in 1938

Sir William Albert Jenkins (9 September 1878 – 23 October 1968) was a Welsh coal exporter, ship owner and Liberal politician.

== Family ==
Jenkins was born in Swansea the son of Daniel and Elizabeth Jenkins. In 1906 he married Beatrice Tyler of Pirbright in Surrey. His wife died in 1967.

== Career ==
At the age of 13 years, Jenkins went to work as an office boy in the Swansea docks where he acquired a thorough knowledge of the coal and shipping trades. He later set up his own business W A Jenkins & Co, wholesale coal and coke factors and shipbrokers. His business expanded greatly during World War One. He served for some years as President of the Swansea Chamber of Trade and was Fellow of the Institute of Chartered Shipbrokers.

== Politics ==
=== Parliament ===
Jenkins was first elected to Parliament at the 1922 general election as a National Liberal. He was elected to represent Breconshire and Radnorshire which he won in a straight fight with Labour. At the 1923 general election he was returned unopposed as a Liberal (without suffix or prefix) for the same seat but in 1924 he faced a three-cornered contest against Labour and Conservative opposition and he lost the seat to the Tories. During his time in Parliament, Jenkins was a contributor to debates concerning industrial questions and Welsh issues. He did not fight again a Parliamentary election again until 1936 when he stood as the candidate of the National Government with the support of the local Liberal and Conservative parties under the description National Liberal at a by-election in Llanelly. He did not win the seat however which was held for Labour by Jim Griffiths the president of the South Wales Miners' Federation with a majority of 16,221 votes, virtually unchanged since the 1935 general election.

=== Local politics and public service ===
Jenkins sat as a member of Swansea Borough Council from 1927 to 1954 and served as Mayor of Swansea between 1947 and 1949. In 1928 he was appointed a Justice of the Peace for the County of Glamorgan and was sometime Chairman of the Bench of Magistrates, Gower Petty sessional division. He was a member of the Court of Governors and Council of University College, Swansea.

=== Other civic or public offices ===
During his long life, Jenkins held a number of other public positions including:

- President of the South West Wales Savings Bank
- President of the Royal Welsh Agricultural Society (1949)
- President of the Swansea and Central Wales Adult Deaf and Dumb Mission
- President of the Deaf and Dumb Regional Association for Wales

== Honours ==
Jenkins was knighted for political and public services and his award of a Knight Bachelor was announced in the New Year Honours List of 1938. He was also awarded the Borough of Swansea Order of St John Council. Jenkins also qualified for a number of foreign decorations. In 1933 he became a Knight, First Class, of the Order of the Dannebrog (Denmark); a holder of the Gold Cross Royal Order of George I of Greece, (1938) and was Chevalier de la Légion d’Honneur (France) in 1949.

== Death ==
Jenkins died at the age of 90 years on 23 October 1968.

Parliament of the United Kingdom
Preceded by Sidney Robinson	Member of Parliament for Brecon & Radnor; 1922 – 1924	Succeeded by Walter D'Arcy Hall
