= Chris Davies (Conservative politician) =

British politician (born 1967)

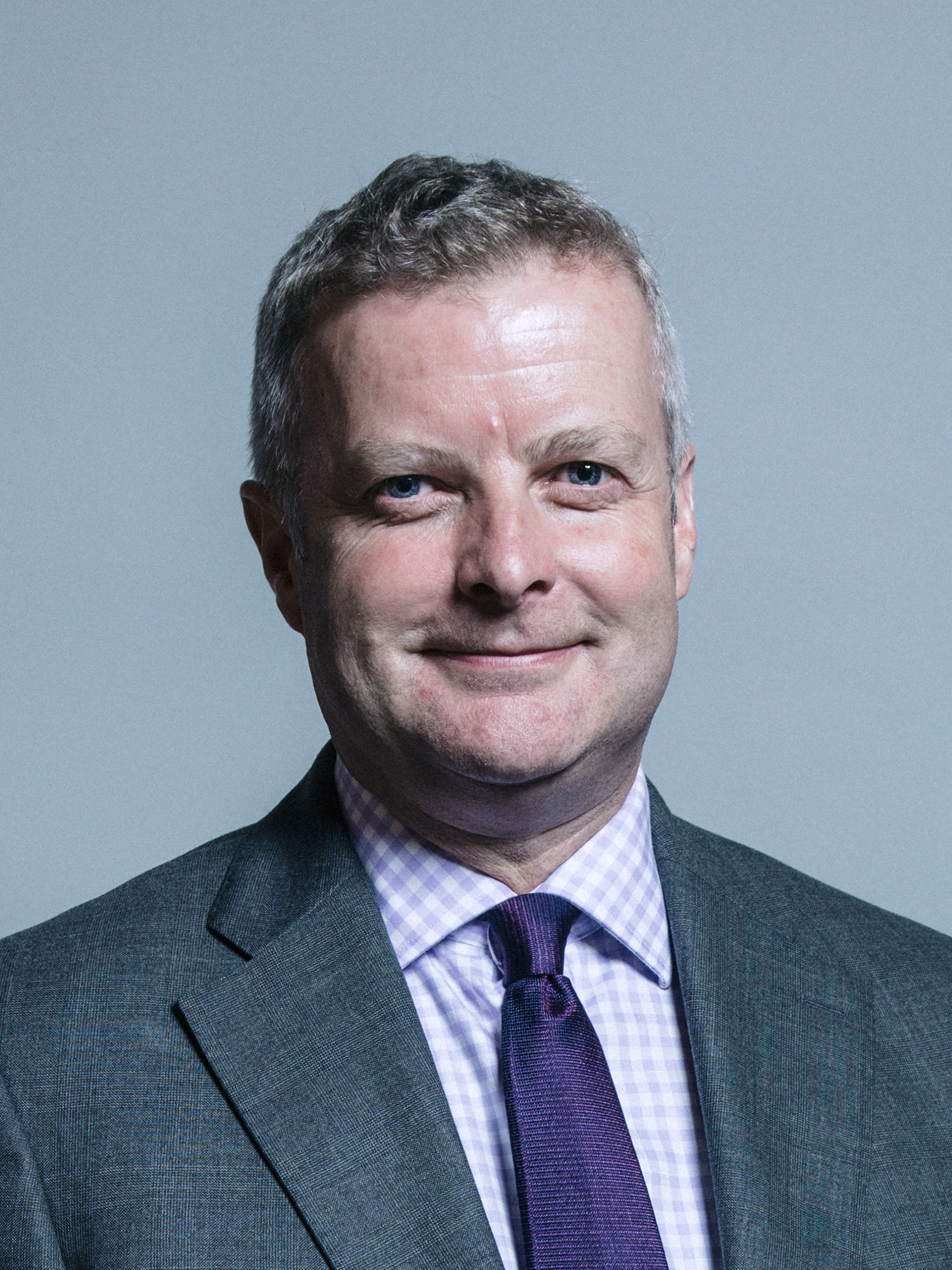

Member of Parliament for Brecon and Radnorshire
- In office 7 May 2015 – 21 June 2019
- Preceded by: Roger Williams
- Succeeded by: Jane Dodds

Personal details
- Born: Christopher Paul Davies; 18 August 1967 (age 58) Swansea Valley, Wales
- Political party: Conservative

Christopher Paul Davies (born 18 August 1967) is a British politician who served as the Member of Parliament (MP) for Brecon and Radnorshire from 2015 to 2019. He is a member of the Conservative Party.

Davies won the seat in the 2015 general election when he defeated incumbent Liberal Democrat Roger Williams. On 22 March 2019, he pleaded guilty to two counts of fraud concerning parliamentary expenses; on 21 June he was removed from office by a recall petition. Davies stood again for the Conservatives in the ensuing 1 August by-election, but lost to the Liberal Democrat candidate Jane Dodds.

== Early life and career ==
Davies attended Morriston School in Wales. He worked as a rural auctioneer and estate agent before managing a large veterinary practice in Hay-on-Wye. He is a regular main ring commentator at the Royal Welsh Show.

== Political career ==
Davies was the Conservative candidate for Brecon and Radnorshire at the 2011 Welsh Assembly election.

He was elected to Powys County Council in 2012, representing Glasbury ward.

He was first elected to the UK Parliament as MP for Brecon and Radnorshire at the 2015 general election, defeating the incumbent Liberal Democrat Roger Williams. He was re-elected with an increased majority at the 2017 election. During the 2017 election campaign, Davies was ordered to repay the cost of 7,500 House of Commons envelopes, costing £5,037.90, which he used to send surveys to his constituents, a week after the decision was taken to dissolve Parliament ahead of the general election. The Independent Parliamentary Standards Authority ruled that Davies “could reasonably have foreseen that responses to the survey would not arrive in time for him to make use of them for parliamentary purposes”, and the content of the letter was “likely to be read as party political". Davies apologised and agreed to repay the costs.

Davies is a lifelong Eurosceptic and a member of the European Research Group. In February 2019 Davies indicated that he was a reluctant supporter of Theresa May’s EU withdrawal deal, explaining that he voted to endorse the government's strategy, as a no deal Brexit remained "very much on the table".

He was a member of the Welsh Affairs Select Committee, and in 2018 was appointed Parliamentary Private Secretary to Stuart Andrew and Nick Bourne in the Wales Office.

== Expenses claims ==
In April 2018, the Independent Parliamentary Standards Authority – which oversees MPs' expenses – referred Davies to the Metropolitan Police "in relation to an allegation of fraudulent expense claims submitted by an individual". Davies said he made an "honest mistake" in the expenses form he submitted for photographs at his Builth Wells constituency office. Accused of forging two invoices for £450 and £250 rather than submitting the true £700 claim for the photographs, Davies attributed the claim to "my inexperience of the IPSA code" and stated that he had done nothing wrong. On 17 July 2018 he was interviewed under caution. Davies was questioned by police for a second time in October 2018 over the allegations.

In January 2019 police passed a file to the Crown Prosecution Service (CPS). On 21 February 2019, the CPS announced that Davies had been charged with two counts of making a false instrument and one count of providing false or misleading information for allowance claims. He pleaded guilty to two counts on 22 March 2019 in the Crown Court at Southwark. On 23 April 2019 he was sentenced to a community order requiring 50 hours' unpaid work, together with a fine of £1,500. In sentencing, the judge said "It seems shocking that when confronted with a simple accounting problem, you thought to forge documents. That is an extraordinary thing for a man with your position and your background to do." The conviction automatically triggered the 2019 Brecon and Radnorshire recall petition. On 21 June 2019 it was announced that 19% of voters had petitioned to recall Davies over a six-week period. As this was more than the 10% threshold, his seat was declared vacant and he automatically ceased to be an MP, necessitating a by-election.

Davies stood in the by-election as the Conservative Party candidate. He lost to the Liberal Democrat candidate Jane Dodds on 1 August 2019.

He was later selected to contest Ynys Môn in the 2019 United Kingdom general election, but stood down after other Welsh Conservatives criticised his selection.

Parliament of the United Kingdom
Preceded by Roger Williams	Member of Parliament for Brecon and Radnorshire; 2015–2019	Succeeded by Jane Dodds
