= Roger Williams (British politician) =

British politician (born 1948)

Roger Williams CBE
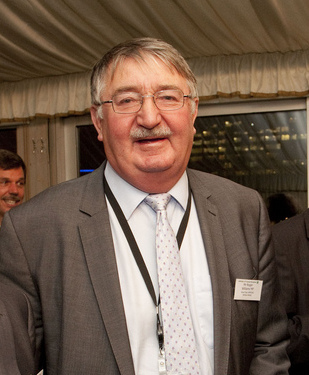

Member of Parliament for Brecon and Radnorshire
- In office 7 June 2001 – 30 March 2015
- Preceded by: Richard Livsey
- Succeeded by: Christopher Davies

Personal details
- Born: 22 January 1948 (age 78) Crickhowell, Powys, Wales
- Party: Labour (Before 1981); SDP (1981–1988); Liberal Democrats (1988–present)
- Spouse: Penny
- Children: 2
- Education: Selwyn College, Cambridge

Roger Hugh Williams, CBE (born 22 January 1948) is a Welsh Liberal Democrat politician who served as the Member of Parliament (MP) for Brecon and Radnorshire from 2001 to 2015.

== Early life ==
Born in the town of Crickhowell, Williams studied at Christ College, Brecon, and Selwyn College, Cambridge. On graduating in Natural Sciences he returned to Breconshire becoming a livestock farmer on the family farm at Llanfilo. During the mid-1980s he was elected Chairman of the Brecon and Radnorshire branch of the National Farmers Union.

== Political career ==
Williams joined the Labour Party in 1969, but left to join the SDP at the formation of the party in 1981, representing it and subsequently the Liberal Democrats on Powys County Council. In 1990, he was elected Chairman of Brecon Beacons National Park. At the 1999 Welsh Assembly election Williams contested Carmarthen West and South Pembrokeshire but finished a distant fifth. He stood down from Powys Council in 2001.

In 2001, he was elected to represent the constituency of Brecon & Radnorshire, subsequently holding the seat with a majority of 751 following the retirement of fellow Liberal Democrat Richard Livsey. At the 2005 election, Williams was returned with an improved majority of 3,905. He served as Shadow Welsh Secretary in the Liberal Democrat Frontbench Team in the 2005-10 Parliament and was re-elected at the 2010 election with a majority of 3,747, however he was defeated for re-election in 2015.

Williams was appointed Commander of the Order of the British Empire (CBE) in the 2013 New Years Honours List for public and political service.

In 2017, he rejoined Powys County Council, winning the seat of Felin-fach, serving until 2022.

== Personal life ==
He married Penelope James in 1973 in Devon. They have a son (born 1975) and daughter (born 1976). They also have four Grandchildren, one of which is Theo Williams.

== Footnotes ==
Parliament of the United Kingdom
Preceded by Richard Livsey	Member of Parliament for Brecon and Radnorshire; 2001–2015	Succeeded by Christopher Davies
