= Ivor Guest, 2nd Viscount Wimborne =

British politician (1903–1967)

The Right Honourable The Viscount Wimborne OBE PC

Member of Parliament for Brecon and Radnorshire
- In office 14 November 1935 – 1 August 1939
- Preceded by: Walter D'Arcy Hall
- Succeeded by: William Frederick Jackson
- Majority: 2,169 (5.2%)

Personal details
- Born: Ivor Grosvenor Guest; 21 February 1903 London, England
- Died: 7 January 1967 (aged 63) Westminster, London, England
- Party: National
- Spouse: Lady Mabel Edith
- Education: Trinity College, Cambridge
- Occupation: Politician

Ivor Grosvenor Guest, 2nd Viscount Wimborne, OBE PC (21 February 1903 – 7 January 1967) was a British politician.

== Early life and education ==
Lord Wimborne was born on 21 February 1903, the son of Ivor Guest, 1st Viscount Wimborne (1873–1939) and his wife The Hon Alice Katherine Sibell Grosvenor (1880-1948). His maternal grandfather was Robert Grosvenor, 2nd Baron Ebury (1834–1918).

He was educated at Eton and Trinity College, Cambridge.

== Career ==
After Cambridge, he served with the Royal Tank Corps (TA), achieving the rank of lieutenant.

From 1935 to 1939, he was National Member of Parliament (MP) for Brecon and Radnor. In the latter year he succeeded his father in the viscountcy and entered the House of Lords.

== Marriage and children ==
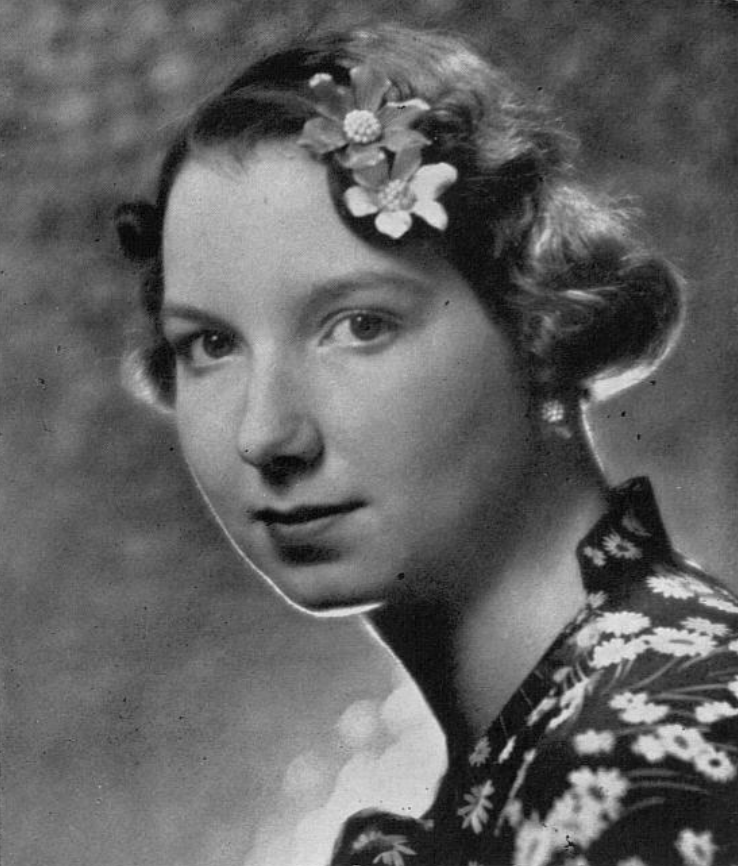
Portrait of Mabel Fox-Strangways published in The Bystander in 1938 on the occasion of her engagement to Lord Wimborne

Lord Wimborne married Lady Mabel Edith Fox-Strangeways, daughter of Giles Fox-Strangways, 6th Earl of Ilchester (1874–1959), in 1938. William Walton, who was the partner of Lord Wimborne's mother Alice from 1934 to 1948, composed "Set me as a seal upon thine heart" for the wedding. They had four children:

- Ivor Fox-Strangways Guest, 3rd Viscount Wimborne (2 December 1939 - 17 December 1993)
- Hon Frances Ann Guest (18 November 1942 - 5 October 2017)
- Hon Julian John Guest (born 12 October 1945)
- Hon Charles James Guest (10 July 1950 - 27 December 2020)

Lord Wimborne died on 7 January 1967, aged 63, and was succeeded in the viscountcy by his eldest son Ivor.

Parliament of the United Kingdom
| Preceded by Walter D'Arcy Hall | Member of Parliament for Brecon and Radnor; 1935 – 1939 | Succeeded by William Jackson |
Peerage of the United Kingdom
| Preceded by Ivor Churchill Guest | Viscount Wimborne; 1939–1967 | Succeeded by Ivor Fox-Strangways Guest |
Party political offices
| Preceded by Patrick Moynihan | Treasurer of the Liberal Party; 1950–1952; With: Wulff Henry Grey; Patrick Moynihan | Succeeded by Wulff Henry Grey; Patrick Moynihan |
