= Brecon and Radnorshire (UK Parliament constituency) =

UK Parliament constituency (1918–2024)

Coordinates: 52.094°N 3.382°W

- Former county constituency for the House of Commons
- Boundary of Brecon and Radnorshire in Wales
- Preserved county: Powys
- Population: 69,197 (2011 census)
- Electorate: 53,032 (April 2019)
- Major settlements: Brecon, Crickhowell, Ystradgynlais, Knighton, Llandrindod Wells

1918–2024
- Seats: One
- Created from: Breconshire; Radnorshire
- Replaced by: Brecon, Radnor and Cwm Tawe
- Senedd: Brecon and Radnorshire, Mid and West Wales

Brecon and Radnorshire (Welsh: Brycheiniog a Sir Faesyfed) was a county constituency in Wales of the House of Commons of the Parliament of the United Kingdom. Created in 1918, it elected one Member of Parliament (MP) by the first-past-the-post system of election.

The constituency was abolished as part of the 2023 review of Westminster constituencies and under the June 2023 final recommendations of the Boundary Commission for Wales. The entire constituency became part of the newly named constituency of Brecon, Radnor and Cwm Tawe.

== Boundaries ==
Map of boundaries 1983-2024

The boundaries of the constituency corresponded broadly with the ancient counties of Brecknockshire and Radnorshire. Radnorshire is included in full, and the only significantly populated area from Brecknockshire not in this constituency is Brynmawr, which is in Blaenau Gwent. This is the largest constituency in England and Wales by area. No town in the constituency exceeds a population of 10,000, the largest being Ystradgynlais at roughly 9,000. Other towns in the constituency were Brecon, Knighton, Crickhowell and Llandrindod Wells. The remainder of the constituency is largely made up of small villages and land used for farming sheep: sheep outnumber humans in Powys as a whole by around ten to one.

Under planned constituency changes announced in September 2016 ahead of the next general election, it was proposed to merge this seat with the southern half of Montgomeryshire, including Newtown, to form a new constituency called Brecon, Radnor and Montgomery.

== History ==
The constituency was created in the boundary changes of 1918 by merging Breconshire and Radnorshire, both previously constituencies in their own right. As part of the third periodic review of Westminster constituencies there were changes to the boundaries in 1983, when the constituency lost several small areas in the south. While historically having been held by the Labour Party for forty years, the constituency was captured from the Conservative government by the SDP–Liberal Alliance at a dramatic by-election in 1985. It was regained by the Conservatives in 1992, taken back by the Liberal Democrats in 1997, and then returned to the Conservatives in 2015. It was the Conservatives' fifteenth target seat at the 2005 election, but the party's share of the vote fell, leaving it as the Conservatives' 95th target seat in 2010, requiring a swing of 5.09%. In the event, the swing to the Conservatives was 0.3%, and the Liberal Democrats retained the seat, with Roger Williams remaining the MP. In 2015 the seat was reclaimed for the Conservatives by Chris Davies, whose majority of 5,102 was the largest in the constituency since Tom Hooson won the seat, also for the Conservatives, in 1983. Roger Williams stood for the Liberal Democrats in 2015 but shed over 6,500 votes from his 2010 result, a loss of 17.8%.

In 2019, Davies pleaded guilty to filing false expenses claims, triggering a recall petition, the third such petition in the UK. The petition was successful, forcing Davies to vacate the seat. A by-election was held on 1 August, which was won by Liberal Democrat candidate Jane Dodds. Dodds was then defeated by Conservative Fay Jones at the general election in December 2019.

== Members of Parliament ==
Year	Member	Whip
1918	Sidney Robinson	Coalition Liberal
Jan 1922	Sidney Robinson	National Liberal
Dec 1922	William Jenkins	National Liberal
Nov 1923	William Jenkins	Liberal
1924	Walter Hall	Conservative
1929	Peter Freeman	Labour
1931	Walter Hall	Conservative
1935	Ivor Guest	National
1939 by-election	William Jackson	Labour
1945	Tudor Watkins	Labour
1970	Caerwyn Roderick	Labour
1979	Tom Hooson	Conservative
1985 by-election	Richard Livsey	Liberal
1988	Richard Livsey	Liberal Democrats
1992	Jonathan Evans	Conservative
1997	Richard Livsey	Liberal Democrats
2001	Roger Williams	Liberal Democrats
2015	Christopher Davies	Conservative
2019 by-election	Jane Dodds	Liberal Democrats
2019	Fay Jones	Conservative
2024	Constituency abolished	

== Elections ==
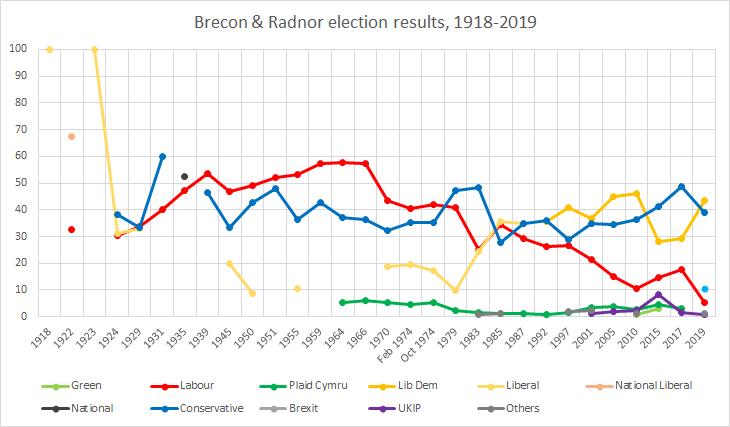
Brecon & Radnor election results, prior to the 2019 United Kingdom general election

=== Elections in the 1910s ===
General election 1918: Brecon and Radnor
Party		Candidate	Votes	%
C	National Liberal	Sidney Robinson	Unopposed	
Registered electors			37,771	
	National Liberal win (new seat)			

=== Elections in the 1920s ===
General election 1922: Brecon and Radnor
Party	Candidate	Votes	%	±%
National Liberal	William Jenkins	20,405	67.4	N/A
Labour	Edward John	9,850	32.6	N/A
Majority		10,555	34.8	N/A
Turnout		30,255	77.9	N/A
Registered electors		38,815		
National Liberal hold		Swing	N/A	

W.A. Jenkins

General election 1923: Brecon and Radnor
Party	Candidate	Votes	%	±%
Liberal	William Jenkins	Unopposed		
Registered electors		39,750		
Liberal hold				

General election 1924: Brecon and Radnor
Party	Candidate	Votes	%	±%
Conservative	Walter Hall	12,834	38.4	N/A
Liberal	William Jenkins	10,374	31.1	N/A
Labour	Edward John	10,167	30.5	N/A
Majority		2,460	7.3	N/A
Turnout		33,375	83.6	N/A
Registered electors		39,943		
Conservative gain from Liberal		Swing	N/A	

General election 1929: Brecon and Radnor
Party	Candidate	Votes	%	±%
Labour	Peter Freeman	14,511	33.7	+3.2
Conservative	Walter Hall	14,324	33.3	―5.1
Liberal	Wynne Cemlyn-Jones	14,182	33.0	+1.9
Majority		187	0.4	N/A
Turnout		43,057	87.7	+4.1
Registered electors		49,031		
Labour gain from Conservative		Swing	+4.2	

=== Elections in the 1930s ===
General election 1931: Brecon and Radnor
Party	Candidate	Votes	%	±%
Conservative	Walter Hall	25,620	59.8	+26.5
Labour	Peter Freeman	17,223	40.2	+6.5
Majority		8,397	19.6	N/A
Turnout		42,843	87.1	―0.6
Registered electors		49,199		
Conservative gain from Labour		Swing		

General election 1935: Brecon and Radnor
Party	Candidate	Votes	%	±%
National	Ivor Guest	22,079	52.6	N/A
Labour	Leslie Haden-Guest	19,910	47.4	+7.2
Majority		2,169	5.2	N/A
Turnout		41,989	84.3	―2.8
Registered electors		49,827		
National hold		Swing		

1939 Brecon and Radnorshire by-election
Party	Candidate	Votes	%	±%
Labour	William Jackson	20,679	53.4	+6.0
Conservative	Richard Hanning Philipps	18,043	46.6	N/A
Majority		2,636	6.8	N/A
Turnout		38,722	79.9	―4.4
Registered electors		48,486		
Labour gain from National		Swing		

=== Elections in the 1940s ===
General Election 1939–40:

Another general election was required to take place before the end of 1940. The political parties had been making preparations for an election to take place from 1939 and by the end of this year, the following candidates had been selected;

- Labour: William Jackson

General election 1945: Brecon and Radnor
Party	Candidate	Votes	%	±%
Labour	Tudor Watkins	19,725	46.8	―0.6
Conservative	Oscar Guest	14,089	33.4	N/A
Liberal	David Lewis	8,335	19.8	N/A
Majority		5,636	13.4	N/A
Turnout		42,149	80.0	―4.3
Registered electors		52,689		
Labour hold		Swing	N/A	

=== Elections in the 1950s ===
General election 1950: Brecon and Radnor
Party	Candidate	Votes	%	±%
Labour	Tudor Watkins	22,519	48.8	+2.0
Conservative	David Gibson-Watt	19,690	42.7	+10.3
Liberal	Rolle Malcolm Ritson Paton	3,903	8.5	―11.3
Majority		2,829	6.1	―7.3
Turnout		46,112	88.8	+8.8
Registered electors		51,951		
Labour hold		Swing	―4.2	

General election 1951: Brecon and Radnor
Party	Candidate	Votes	%	±%
Labour	Tudor Watkins	24,572	52.2	+3.4
Conservative	David Gibson-Watt	22,489	47.8	+5.1
Majority		2,083	4.4	―1.7
Turnout		47,061	89.2	+0.4
Registered electors		52,728		
Labour hold		Swing	―0.9	

General election 1955: Brecon and Radnor
Party	Candidate	Votes	%	±%
Labour	Tudor Watkins	23,953	53.1	+0.9
Conservative	Henry Graham Partridge	16,412	36.4	―11.4
Liberal	Russell Thomas	4,745	10.5	N/A
Majority		7,541	16.7	+12.3
Turnout		45,110	86.8	―2.4
Registered electors		51,969		
Labour hold		Swing	+6.2	

General election 1959: Brecon and Radnor
Party	Candidate	Votes	%	±%
Labour	Tudor Watkins	25,411	57.3	+4.2
Conservative	John H. Davies	18,939	42.7	+6.3
Majority		6,472	14.6	―2.1
Turnout		44,350	86.4	―0.4
Registered electors		51,357		
Labour hold		Swing	―1.1	

=== Elections in the 1960s ===
General election 1964: Brecon and Radnor
Party	Candidate	Votes	%	±%
Labour	Tudor Watkins	23,967	57.7	+0.4
Conservative	Frank T. Stevens	15,415	37.1	―5.6
Plaid Cymru	Trefor Richard Morgan	2,165	5.2	N/A
Majority		8,552	20.6	+6.0
Turnout		41,547	82.8	―3.6
Registered electors		50,159		
Labour hold		Swing	+3.0	

General election 1966: Brecon and Radnor
Party	Candidate	Votes	%	±%
Labour	Tudor Watkins	22,902	57.5	―0.2
Conservative	Frank T. Stevens	14,523	36.5	―0.6
Plaid Cymru	Trefor Richard Morgan	2,410	6.0	+0.8
Majority		8,379	21.0	+0.4
Turnout		39,835	80.5	―2.3
Registered electors		49,464		
Labour hold		Swing	+0.2	

=== Elections in the 1970s ===
General election 1970: Brecon and Radnor
Party	Candidate	Votes	%	±%
Labour	Caerwyn Roderick	18,736	43.4	―14.1
Conservative	Gareth John Jarvis Neale	13,892	32.2	―4.3
Liberal	Geraint Howells	8,169	18.9	N/A
Plaid Cymru	William George Jenkins	2,349	5.4	―0.6
Majority		4,844	11.2	―9.8
Turnout		43,146	81.9	+1.4
Registered electors		52,694		
Labour hold		Swing	―4.9	

General election February 1974: Brecon and Radnor
Party	Candidate	Votes	%	±%
Labour	Caerwyn Roderick	18,180	40.5	―2.9
Conservative	Lloyd Havard Davies	15,903	35.4	+3.2
Liberal	Noel Kennedy Thomas	8,741	19.5	+0.6
Plaid Cymru	Dafydd Noel Gittins	2,099	4.7	―0.7
Majority		2,277	5.1	―6.1
Turnout		44,923	83.4	+1.5
Registered electors		53,857		
Labour hold		Swing	―3.1	

General election October 1974: Brecon and Radnor
Party	Candidate	Votes	%	±%
Labour	Caerwyn Roderick	18,622	42.1	+1.6
Conservative	Lloyd Havard Davies	15,610	35.3	―0.1
Liberal	Noel Kennedy Thomas	7,682	17.4	―2.1
Plaid Cymru	Dafydd Noel Gittins	2,300	5.2	+0.5
Majority		3,012	6.8	+1.7
Turnout		44,214	81.4	―2.0
Registered electors		54,300		
Labour hold		Swing	+0.9	

General election 1979: Brecon and Radnor
Party	Candidate	Votes	%	±%
Conservative	Tom Hooson	22,660	47.2	+11.9
Labour	Caerwyn Roderick	19,633	40.9	―1.2
Liberal	Norman Lewis	4,654	9.7	―7.7
Plaid Cymru	Janet Power	1,031	2.1	―3.1
Majority		3,027	6.3	N/A
Turnout		47,978	84.2	+2.8
Registered electors		56,975		
Conservative gain from Labour		Swing	+6.6	

=== Elections in the 1980s ===
General election 1983: Brecon and Radnor
Party	Candidate	Votes	%	±%
Conservative	Tom Hooson	18,255	48.2	+1.0
Labour	David Morris	9,471	25.0	―15.9
Liberal	Richard Livsey	9,226	24.4	+14.7
Plaid Cymru	Sian Meredudd	640	1.7	―0.4
Independent	Richard Booth	278	0.7	N/A
Majority		8,784	23.2	+16.9
Turnout		37,870	80.1	―4.1
Registered electors		47,277		
Conservative hold		Swing	+8.4	

By-election 1985: Brecon and Radnor
Party	Candidate	Votes	%	±%
Liberal	Richard Livsey	13,753	35.8	+11.4
Labour	Frederick Willey	13,194	34.4	+9.4
Conservative	Chris Butler	10,631	27.7	―20.5
Plaid Cymru	Janet Davies	435	1.1	―0.6
Monster Raving Loony	Screaming Lord Sutch	202	0.5	N/A
One Nation Conservative	Roger Everest	154	0.4	N/A
Independent	Andre C. L. Genillard	43	0.1	N/A
Majority		559	1.4	N/A
Turnout		38,412	79.4	−0.7
Registered electors		48,371		
Liberal gain from Conservative		Swing	+16.0	

General election 1987: Brecon and Radnor
Party	Candidate	Votes	%	±%
Liberal	Richard Livsey	14,509	34.8	+10.4
Conservative	Jonathan Evans	14,453	34.7	―13.5
Labour	Frederick Willey	12,180	29.2	+4.2
Plaid Cymru	John Davies	535	1.3	―0.4
Majority		56	0.1	N/A
Turnout		41,677	84.3	+4.2
Registered electors		49,394		
Liberal gain from Conservative		Swing	+12.0	

=== Elections in the 1990s ===
General election 1992: Brecon and Radnor
Party	Candidate	Votes	%	±%
Conservative	Jonathan Evans	15,977	36.1	+1.4
Liberal Democrats	Richard Livsey	15,847	35.8	+1.0
Labour	Christopher Mann	11,634	26.3	―2.9
Plaid Cymru	Sian Meredudd	418	0.9	―0.4
Green	Hugh Richards	393	0.9	N/A
Majority		130	0.3	N/A
Turnout		44,269	85.9	+1.6
Registered electors		51,509		
Conservative gain from Liberal Democrats		Swing	+0.2	

General election 1997: Brecon and Radnorshire
Party	Candidate	Votes	%	±%
Liberal Democrats	Richard Livsey	17,516	40.8	+5.0
Conservative	Jonathan Evans	12,419	29.0	―7.1
Labour	Christopher Mann	11,424	26.6	+0.3
Referendum	Elizabeth Phillips	900	2.1	N/A
Plaid Cymru	Steven Cornelius	622	1.5	+0.6
Majority		5,097	11.8	N/A
Turnout		42,881	82.2	―3.7
Registered electors		52,142		
Liberal Democrats gain from Conservative		Swing	+6.1	

The Labour candidate, Chris Mann, won the selection over future AMs Carwyn Jones and Jeffrey Cuthbert, and future AM and MP Peter Law.

=== Elections in the 2000s ===
General election 2001: Brecon and Radnorshire
Party	Candidate	Votes	%	±%
Liberal Democrats	Roger Williams	13,824	36.8	―4.0
Conservative	Felix Aubel	13,073	34.8	+5.8
Labour	Huw Irranca-Davies	8,024	21.4	―5.2
Plaid Cymru	Brynach Parri	1,301	3.5	+2.0
Independent	Ian Mitchell	762	2.0	N/A
UKIP	Elizabeth Phillips	452	1.2	N/A
Independent	Robert Nicholson	80	0.2	N/A
Majority		751	2.0	―9.8
Turnout		37,516	70.5	―11.7
Registered electors		53,247		
Liberal Democrats hold		Swing	―5.0	

General election 2005: Brecon and Radnorshire
Party	Candidate	Votes	%	±%
Liberal Democrats	Roger Williams	17,182	44.8	+8.0
Conservative	Andrew RT Davies	13,277	34.6	―0.2
Labour	Leighton Veale	5,755	15.0	―6.4
Plaid Cymru	Mabon ap Gwynfor	1,404	3.7	+0.2
UKIP	Elizabeth Phillips	723	1.9	+0.7
Majority		3,905	10.2	+8.2
Turnout		38,341	69.5	―1.0
Registered electors		55,171		
Liberal Democrats hold		Swing	+4.1	

=== Elections in the 2010s ===
General election 2010: Brecon and Radnorshire
Party	Candidate	Votes	%	±%
Liberal Democrats	Roger Williams	17,929	46.2	+1.4
Conservative	Suzy Davies	14,182	36.5	+1.9
Labour	Chris Lloyd	4,096	10.4	―4.5
Plaid Cymru	Janet Davies	989	2.5	―1.1
UKIP	Clive Easton	876	2.3	+0.4
Green	Dorienne Robinson	341	0.9	N/A
Christian	Jeffery Green	222	0.6	N/A
Monster Raving Loony	Chris "Lord Offa of the Dyke" Rogers	210	0.5	N/A
Majority		3,747	9.7	―0.5
Turnout		38,845	72.5	+3.0
Registered electors		53,589		
Liberal Democrats hold		Swing	―0.3	

General election 2015: Brecon and Radnorshire
Party	Candidate	Votes	%	±%
Conservative	Christopher Davies	16,453	41.1	+4.6
Liberal Democrats	Roger Williams	11,351	28.3	―17.9
Labour	Matthew Dorrance	5,904	14.7	+4.3
UKIP	Darran Thomas	3,338	8.3	+6.0
Plaid Cymru	Freddy Greaves	1,767	4.4	+1.9
Green	Chris Carmichael	1,261	3.1	+2.2
Majority		5,102	12.8	N/A
Turnout		40,074	73.8	+1.3
Registered electors		54,441		
Conservative gain from Liberal Democrats		Swing	+11.1	

General election 2017: Brecon and Radnorshire
Party	Candidate	Votes	%	±%
Conservative	Christopher Davies	20,081	48.6	+7.5
Liberal Democrats	James Gibson-Watt	12,043	29.1	+0.8
Labour	Dan Lodge	7,335	17.7	+3.0
Plaid Cymru	Kate Heneghan	1,299	3.1	―1.3
UKIP	Peter Gilbert	576	1.4	―6.9
Majority		8,038	19.5	+6.7
Turnout		41,334	76.9	+3.1
Registered electors		56,010		
Conservative hold		Swing	+3.4	

Following the successful recall petition of Christopher Davies, a by-election was held on 1 August 2019.

2019 Brecon and Radnorshire by-election
Party	Candidate	Votes	%	±%
Liberal Democrats	Jane Dodds	13,826	43.5	+14.4
Conservative	Christopher Davies	12,401	39.0	―9.6
Brexit Party	Des Parkinson	3,331	10.5	N/A
Labour	Tom Davies	1,680	5.3	―12.4
Monster Raving Loony	Lady Lily the Pink	334	1.0	N/A
UKIP	Liz Phillips	242	0.7	―0.7
Rejected ballots		73		
Majority		1,425	4.5	N/A
Turnout		31,814	59.7	―17.2
Registered electors				
Liberal Democrats gain from Conservative		Swing	+12.0	

Of the 73 rejected ballots:

- 58 were either unmarked or it was uncertain who the vote was for.
- 14 voted for more than one candidate.
- 1 had writing or mark by which the voter could be identified.

Changes in vote share are compared to the 2017 general election, not the 2019 by-election.

General election 2019: Brecon and Radnorshire
Party	Candidate	Votes	%	±%
Conservative	Fay Jones	21,958	53.1	+4.5
Liberal Democrats	Jane Dodds	14,827	35.9	+6.8
Labour	Tomos Davies	3,944	9.5	―8.2
Monster Raving Loony	Lady Lily the Pink	345	0.8	N/A
Christian	Jeff Green	245	0.6	N/A
Rejected ballots		110		
Majority		7,131	17.2	―2.3
Turnout		41,319	74.5	―2.4
Registered electors		55,490		
Conservative hold		Swing	―1.1	

Of the 110 rejected ballots:

- 87 were either unmarked or it was uncertain who the vote was for.
- 21 voted for more than one candidate.
- 2 had writing or mark by which the voter could be identified.

== See also ==
- Brecon and Radnorshire (Senedd constituency)
- List of UK Parliament constituencies in Powys
- List of UK Parliament constituencies in Wales
