= Arthur Walsh, 3rd Baron Ormathwaite =

British Army officer, politician, peer and courtier

The Right Honourable The Lord Ormathwaite GCVO

Master of the Ceremonies
- In office 1907–1920

Member of Parliament for Radnorshire
- In office 1885–1892

Personal details
- Born: Arthur Henry John Walsh; 10 April 1859
- Died: 13 March 1937 (aged 77)

Arthur Henry John Walsh, 3rd Baron Ormathwaite, GCVO (10 April 1859 – 13 March 1937) was a British Army officer, politician, peer and courtier.

Walsh was the eldest son of the 2nd Baron Ormathwaite and his wife, Katherine, a daughter of the 7th Duke of Beaufort. He was educated at Eton College. In 1876 he was commissioned a Sub-Lieutenant in the Royal South Wales Borderers Militia, and promoted to lieutenant later the same year. In 1878 he transferred to the Regular Army as a second lieutenant in the 1st Life Guards and was later promoted to lieutenant. In 1887 he left the Regular Army and became a second lieutenant in the Royal East Kent Yeomanry, serving until 1890.

In 1885, Walsh entered Parliament as Conservative MP for Radnorshire and held the seat until his defeat by Liberal Francis Edwards in 1892. On 26 July 1890, he had married Lady Clementine Pratt, the only daughter of the 3rd Marquess Camden.

In 1892 he became an equerry in waiting to The Queen. In 1897, he was briefly Comptroller of the Household to The Duchess of Teck before her death that year and he carried her coronet at her funeral. He served as a Gentleman Usher (1902–1905) and Groom-in-Waiting (1905–1907) to King Edward VII and was Master of the Ceremonies from 1907 to 1920 and Lord Lieutenant of Radnorshire from 1917 to 1921.

Walsh was appointed Member of the Royal Victorian Order 4th Class (MVO) in 1907, promoted to Commander (CVO) in the 1910 New Year Honours, Knight Commander (KCVO) in the 1912 New Year Honours, and Knight Grand Cross (GCVO) in the 1920 Birthday Honours on his retirement.

Walsh inherited his father's title in 1920 and on his own death in 1937 without children it passed to his brother, George.

Parliament of the United Kingdom
| Preceded by Sir Richard Green-Price, Bt | Member of Parliament for Radnorshire; 1885–1892 | Succeeded by Francis Edwards |
Court offices
| Preceded by Alexander Hood | Comptroller to The Duchess of Teck; 1897 | Succeeded by None (death of the Duchess of Teck) |
| Preceded by Hon. Aubrey FitzClarence | Gentleman Usher; 1902–1905 | Succeeded by Harry Lloyd-Verney |
| Preceded by Sir John Fullerton | Groom-in-Waiting; 1905–1907 | Succeeded by Archibald Milne |
| Preceded by Sir Douglas Dawson | Master of the Ceremonies; 1907–1920 | Succeeded by John Hanbury-Williams as Marshal of the Diplomatic Corps |
Honorary titles
| Preceded by Sir Powlett Milbank, Bt | Lord Lieutenant of Radnorshire; 1918–1922 | Succeeded by Charles Coltman-Rogers |
Peerage of the United Kingdom
| Preceded by Arthur Walsh | Baron Ormathwaite; 1920–1937 | Succeeded by George Walsh |
