= Caerwyn Roderick =

British politician (1927–2011)

Member of Parliament for Brecon and Radnorshire
- In office 18 June 1970 – 7 April 1979
- Preceded by: Tudor Watkins
- Succeeded by: Tom Hooson

Personal details
- Born: 15 July 1927
- Died: 16 October 2011 (aged 84)
- Party: Labour
- Education: University College of North Wales, Bangor

Caerwyn Eifion Roderick (15 July 1927 – 16 October 2011) was a British Labour Party politician. He was Member of Parliament (MP) for Brecon and Radnor from 1970 to 1979, when he lost to the Conservative candidate Tom Hooson.

== Early life ==
Roderick was the son of David Morgan Roderick of Ystradgynlais, Powys. A Welsh-speaker, he was educated locally and at the University College of North Wales, Bangor. In 1949, he took up a teaching post at Caterham, Surrey and later taught at Brecon boys' grammar school (1954–57) and Hartridge high school, Newport (1960–69). From 1954 until 1957 he worked for the National Coal Board.

== Parliamentary career ==
In 1969, Roderick was chosen as Labour candidate for Brecon and Radnor, in succession to Tudor Watkins, who had held the seat since 1945. At the 1970 General Election, Roderick had a majority of 4,844, little more than half that obtained by his predecessor four years previously.

Roderick proved to be an assiduous and active constituency member, campaigning to prevent further rail closures and the proposed creation of a reservoir which would entail the flooding of the Senni Valley. He also supported cheaper petrol for rural areas and was a pioneer of free public transport. Labour's main strength in the constituency lay in the industrial townships in its southern extremities, including Roderick's home village of Ystradgynlais. However, the party's hold on the constituency since 1945 also depended upon support in the rural areas and this became increasingly unstable in the 1970s. Roderick's majority fell to 2,277 at the general election of February 1974 and only recovered to 3.012 in October when the party did much better nationally.

Following Labour's return to office in 1974, Roderick became successively parliamentary private secretary to Eric Heffer, Tony Benn and, from 1975, Michael Foot. Foot became deputy leader of the Labour Party the following year. Roderick was a strong supporter of devolution for Wales but opposed the Common Market which he considered an unmitigated disaster. He also opposed the Vietnam war and apartheid in South Africa and was a member of the Tribune group of Labour MPs.

At the 1979 General Election, Roderick failed to hold his marginal seat, which fell to the Conservatives. Since then, Labour has never regained the seat; his former voters turned to the Liberal Democrats instead.

== Later life and career ==
Roderick's parliamentary career ended with his defeat, although he became a member of South Glamorgan County Council in 1980 and remained a member until the authority was abolished in 1996. From 1980 until 1991, Roderick was a district officer of the National Union of Teachers, for whom he had been a parliamentary consultant while an MP.

Roderick welcomed the result of the 1997 referendum on devolution, which led to the establishment of the Welsh Assembly. However, he gradually distanced himself from the Labour Party, having been disappointed by the direction of the Blair government.

Roderick married his wife Eirlys in 1952, and they had three children and six grandchildren. He died on 16 October 2011, aged 84.

== Sources ==
=== Online ===
- Roth, Andrew (7 December 2011). "Caerwyn Roderick obituary". The Guardian.

Parliament of the United Kingdom
Preceded by Tudor Watkins	Member of Parliament for Brecon & Radnor; 1970–1979	Succeeded by Tom Hooson
