= Walter Hall (British politician) =

British soldier and politician (1891–1980)

Walter D'Arcy Hall
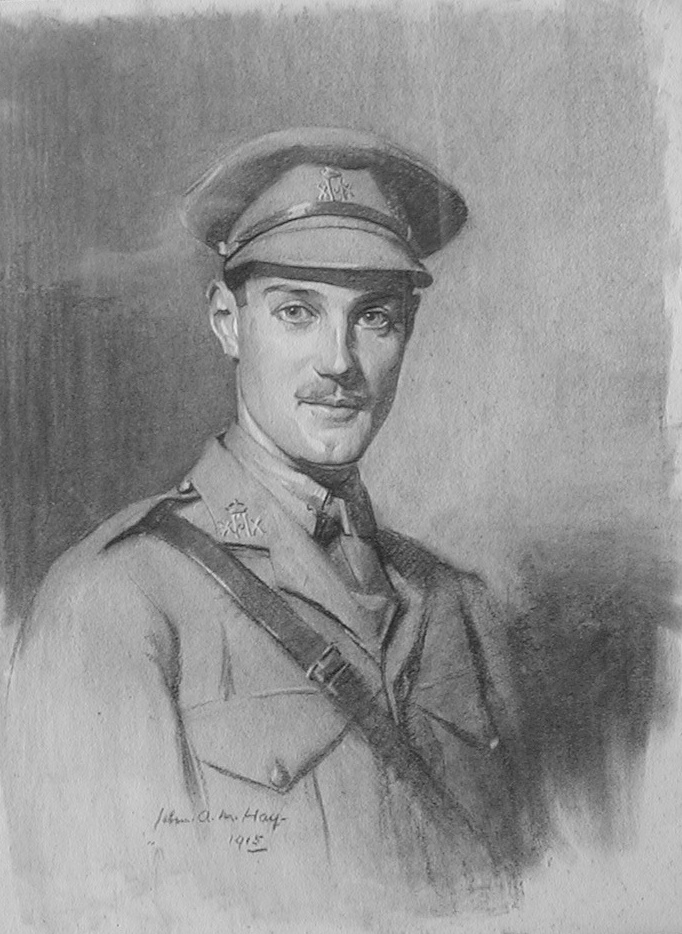
- 1915 (age 23)
- Born: 10 September 1891; Melbourne, Australia
- Died: 22 January 1980 (aged 88); Salisbury, England
- Resting place: Woodford, Wiltshire
- Citizenship: UK
- Spouse: Anne Madeleine Brook
- Children: Edward Thomas Hall, William Hall, Betty Hall
- Parent(s): Thomas Skarratt Hall, Jane Kirk
- Awards: MC & Bar, Croix de Guerre

Lieutenant-Colonel Walter D'Arcy Hall, MC & Bar (10 August 1891 – 22 January 1980) was a soldier, Unionist Member of Parliament and hunter of game (big and small).

Hall was born in South Yarra, Melbourne, Australia, son of Thomas Skarratt Hall. He moved to England when he was four-years old. Hall was educated at Eton College, Berkshire and at the Royal Military College, Sandhurst, he joined the 20th Hussars in 1911.

During the First World War Hall was awarded the Military Cross and Bar, and the Croix de Guerre with Palm and Star. Perhaps his most gallant action occurred on 1 April 1918 when, with 138 men of the 20th Hussars, he formed a dismounted company in support of the 4th Dismounted Battalion, leading them in a counter-attack against Rifle Wood (Bois d'Hourges 49°48′23″N 2°30′37″E) near Domart-sur-la-Luce. The wood was well defended, and the 20th suffered heavy casualties in the action. Nonetheless, Hall and his men captured the wood and held it until relieved by the infantry. For this and other dismounted actions by members of the 2nd Cavalry Division, the Division was warmly praised by the Commander of 4th Army, General Sir Henry Rawlinson. For a period (June–August 1915) Hall was seconded to 5 Squadron, C Flight in the Royal Flying Corps as an observer.

Hall was elected Member of Parliament for the Welsh constituency of Brecon and Radnor on 29 October 1924 but lost his seat at the 1929 general election. He was re-elected for the same seat on 27 October 1931, serving until his retirement at the general election on 14 November 1935.

== Legacy ==
Hall was the father of the scientist Edward Thomas Hall. His other son, Bill, was killed in Italy during WW2.

Parliament of the United Kingdom
| Preceded by William Albert Jenkins | Member of Parliament for Brecon & Radnor; 1924 – 1929 | Succeeded by Peter Freeman |
| Preceded by Peter Freeman | Member of Parliament for Brecon & Radnor; 1931 – 1935 | Succeeded by Ivor Guest |
