= Tudor Watkins, Baron Watkins =

Welsh politician

The Right Honourable The Lord Watkins

Member of Parliament for Brecon and Radnorshire
- In office 1945 – 18 June 1970
- Preceded by: William Jackson
- Succeeded by: Caerwyn Roderick

Personal details
- Born: 9 May 1903
- Died: 2 November 1983 (aged 80)
- Party: Labour

Tudor Elwyn Watkins, Baron Watkins (9 May 1903 – 2 November 1983) was a Welsh Labour Party politician.

== Background ==
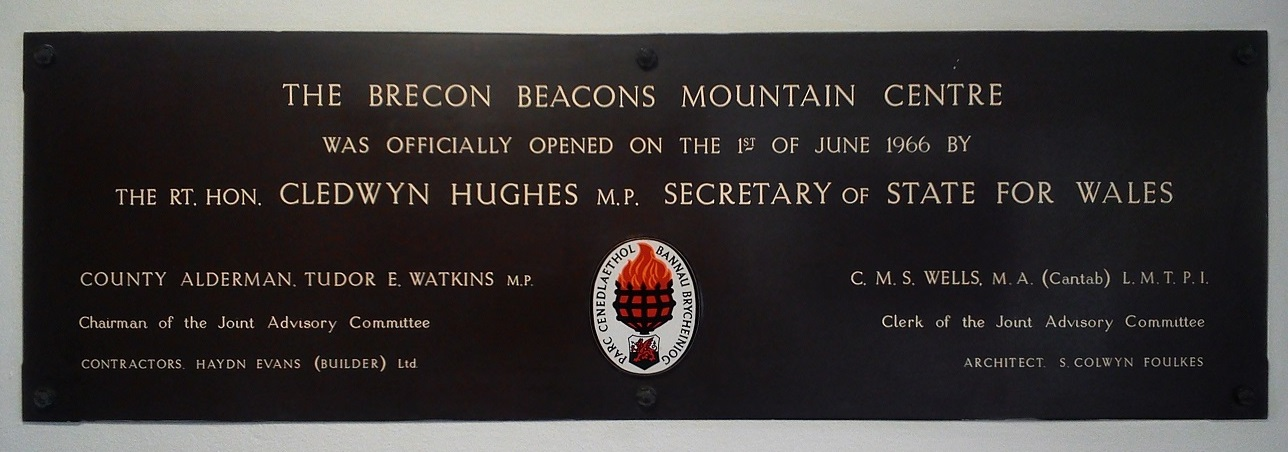
Tablet at the Brecon Beacons Mountain Centre with references to Cledwyn Hughes and Tudor Watkins

Watkins was born at Abercrave on 9 May 1903. He worked as a miner from 1917 until 1925, served as a Labour Party constituency agent in Brecon and Radnorshire from 1925 until 1933, and was the general secretary to the Breconshire Association of Friendly Societies from 1937 until 1948.

== Service in Parliament ==
He was a Labour Member of Parliament for Brecon and Radnorshire from 1945, winning all succeeding elections (including two consecutive defeats, in 1950 and 1951, of David Gibson-Watt) until his retirement at the 1970 general election. He strongly supported the Parliament for Wales campaign in the early 1950s, and was also a supporter of the Campaign for Nuclear Disarmament. He visited the Soviet Union in 1961, and Patagonia in 1965.

He is also credited with preserving the only known population of the lesser whitebeam (sorbus minima) which was endangered in 1947 by British Army mortar practice in and around its habitat, by raising the issue in the Commons, and inducing War Secretary Frederick Bellenger to order the Army to pull out of the area.

After retiring from the House of Commons he was created a life peer on 10 May 1972 as Baron Watkins, of Glyntawe in the County of Brecknock.

== Death and legacy ==
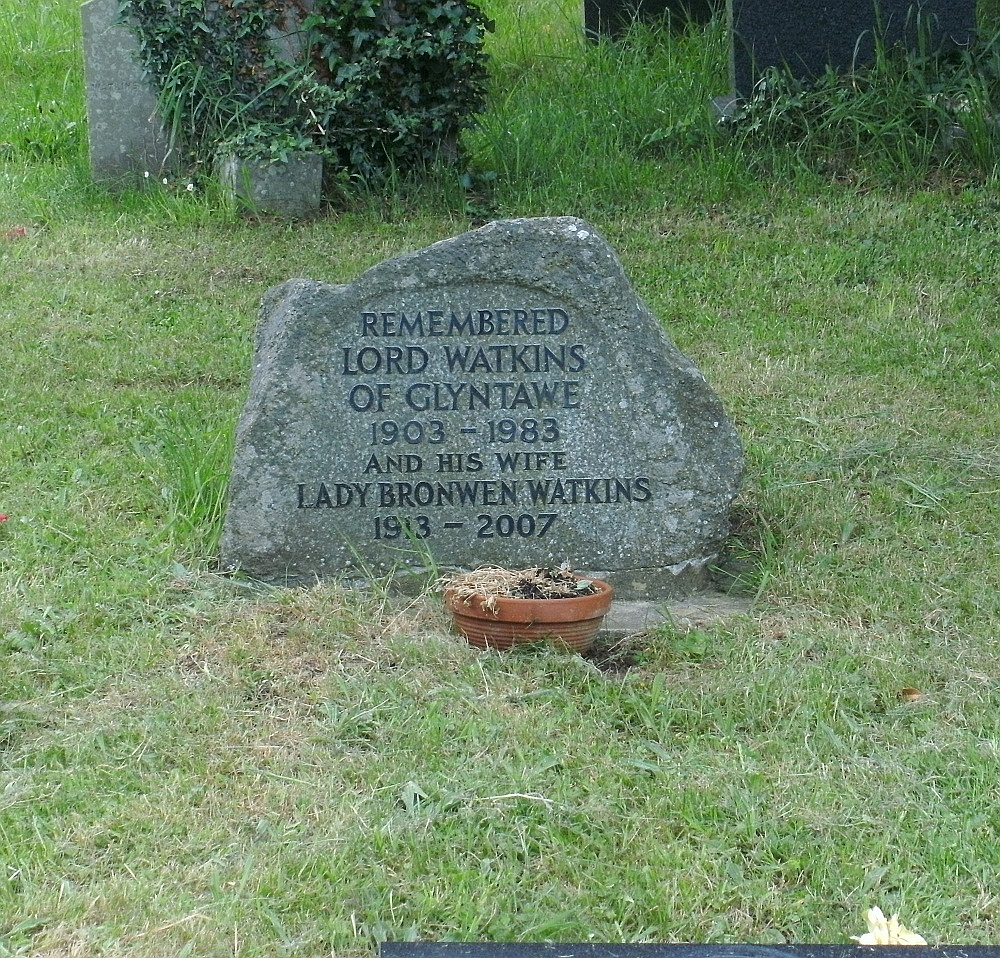
Lord and Lady Watkins' grave at St David's Church, Llanfaes, Brecon

Lord Watkins died on 2 November 1983. He was cremated and his ashes buried in the churchyard of St David's Church, Llanfaes, Brecon. His wife's ashes are also buried there. His papers are in the holdings of the National Library of Wales.

== Sources ==
=== Books and journals ===
- Jones, J. Graham (December 1992). "The Parliament for Wales campaign, 1950-1956" (PDF). Welsh History Review. 16 (2): 207–36.
- Leigh Rayment's Peerage Pages
- Leigh Rayment's Historical List of MPs

Parliament of the United Kingdom
Preceded by William Jackson	Member of Parliament for Brecon and Radnorshire; 1945–1970	Succeeded by Caerwyn Roderick
