= List of standardised Welsh place-names in Ceredigion =

Location of Ceredigion in Wales.

The list of standardised Welsh place-names, for places in Ceredigion, is a list compiled by the Welsh Language Commissioner to recommend the standardisation of the spelling of Welsh place-names, particularly in the Welsh language and when multiple forms are used, although some place-names in English were also recommended to be matched with the Welsh. The list contains 237 entries, as of November 2023.

The list is based on recommendations provided by the Place-names Standardisation Panel, convened by the Commissioner, for expert advice on the standardisation of Welsh place-names. The panel bases their decisions on a set of guidelines (currently dating to June 2023), specific to Welsh settlement names (such as those of villages, towns, and cities) and topographic features (such as lakes, mountains and rivers). The panel does not cover house or building names, although similar principles could be applied to them or to names for new developments (for which the Commissioner offers their own advice to local authorities and housing developers). The panel may also have used additional guidelines.

The list was first published in 2018, and took years to put together. Upon creation, these lists were published under the Open Government Licence 3.0.

In 2021, Ceredigion County Council announced it would consider implementing the list's recommendations. The addition of hyphens was described as "hyphengate".

== List ==
Recommended standardised names		Not recommended names		Type	Grid reference
Welsh	English	Welsh	English	Type	Grid reference
Aberaeron	Aberaeron			Settlement	SN4562
Aber-arth	Aber-arth		Aberarth	Settlement	SN4763
Aber-banc	Aber-banc		Aberbanc	Settlement	SN3541
Aber-ffrwd	Aber-ffrwd		Aberffrwd	Settlement	SN6878
Aberllolwyn	Aberllolwyn			Man-made feature	SN5877
Aber-mad	Aber-mad			Man-made feature	SN6076
Abermagwr	Abermagwr			Settlement	SN6673
Abermeurig	Abermeurig			Area	SN5656
Aber-porth	Aber-porth		Aberporth	Settlement	SN2651
Aberteifi	Cardigan			Settlement	SN1746
Aberystwyth	Aberystwyth			Settlement	SN5881
Alltyblaca	Alltyblaca		Alltyblacca	Settlement	SN5245
Alltyrodyn	Alltyrodyn			Man-made feature	SN4444
Atpar	Atpar		Adpar	Settlement	SN3041
Bancydarren	Bancydarren		Banc-y-Darren	Settlement	SN6782
Bangor Teifi	Bangor Teifi			Settlement	SN3840
Bethania	Bethania			Settlement	SN5763
Betws Bledrws	Betws Bledrws			Settlement	SN5952
Betws Ifan	Betws Ifan			Settlement	SN3047
Beulah	Beulah			Settlement	SN2846
Blaenannerch	Blaenannerch			Settlement	SN2449
Blaencelyn	Blaencelyn		Blaen Celyn	Settlement	SN3554
Blaencil-llech	Blaencil-llech			Settlement	SN3243
Blaengeuffordd	Blaengeuffordd		Blaen-geuffordd	Settlement	SN6480
Blaenpennal	Blaenpennal			Settlement	SN6264
Blaen-plwyf	Blaen-plwyf		Blaenplwyf	Settlement	SN5775
Blaen-porth	Blaen-porth			Settlement	SN2648
Blaen-waun	Blaen-waun			Area	SN3953
Bont-goch	Bont-goch		Bont Goch	Settlement	SN6886
Bontnewydd	Bontnewydd			Settlement	SN6165
Y Borth Uchaf	Upper Borth			Settlement	SN6088
Y Borth	Y Borth		Borth	Settlement	SN6089
Bow Street	Bow Street			Settlement	SN6284
Bronant	Bronant			Settlement	SN6467
Brongest	Brongest			Settlement	SN3245
Bron-gwyn	Bron-gwyn		Brongwyn	Settlement	SN2843
Bronwydd	Bronwydd			Settlement	SN3543
Brynafan	Brynafan			Settlement	SN7173
Bryn-gwyn	Bryn-gwyn		Bryngwyn	Settlement	SN2945
Brynhoffnant	Brynhoffnant			Settlement	SN3351
Bryn-teg	Bryn-teg			Settlement	SN4843
Bwlch-llan	Bwlch-llan			Settlement	SN5758
Bwlchyfadfa	Bwlchyfadfa			Area	SN4349
Bwlch-y-groes	Bwlch-y-groes			Settlement	SN3746
Caerwedros	Caerwedros			Settlement	SN3755
Capel Bangor	Capel Bangor			Settlement	SN6580
Capel Betws Leucu	Capel Betws Leucu		Capel Betws Lleucu	Settlement	SN6058
Capel Cynon	Capel Cynon			Settlement	SN3849
Capel Dewi	Capel Dewi			Settlement	SN4542
Capel Dewi	Capel Dewi			Settlement	SN6282
Capel Madog	Capel Madog			Area	SN6582
Capel Seion	Capel Seion			Settlement	SN6379
Capel Tygwydd	Capel Tygwydd			Settlement	SN2743
Carn Owen	Carn Owen			Man-made feature	SN7388
Carn Penrhiwllwydog	Carn Penrhiwllwydog			Man-made feature	SN7352
Cefn-llwyd	Cefn-llwyd		Cefn-y-Llwyd	Settlement	SN6483
Cei-bach	Cei-bach			Settlement	SN4059
Ceinewydd	New Quay			Settlement	SN3859
Cellan	Cellan			Settlement	SN6149
Cilcennin	Cilcennin			Settlement	SN5260
Ciliau Aeron	Ciliau Aeron			Settlement	SN5058
Clarach	Clarach			Settlement	SN6083
Cnwch-coch	Cnwch-coch		Cnwch Coch	Settlement	SN6775
Cnwcylili	Cnwcylili			Settlement	SN3958
Coed-y-bryn	Coed-y-bryn			Settlement	SN3545
Comins-coch	Comins-coch		Comins Coch	Settlement	SN6182
Craigypenrhyn	Craigypenrhyn		Craig-y-penrhyn	Settlement	SN6592
Cribyn	Cribyn			Settlement	SN5251
Croes-lan	Croes-lan			Settlement	SN3844
Croes-y-llan	Croes-y-llan			Settlement	SN1945
Cwmbrwyno	Cwmbrwyno			Settlement	SN7080
Cwm-cou	Cwm-cou			Settlement	SN2941
Cwmerfyn	Cwmerfyn			Settlement	SN6982
Cwmergyr	Cwmergyr			Area	SN7982
Cwmsychbant	Cwmsychbant			Settlement	SN4746
Cwmsymlog	Cwmsymlog			Settlement	SN7083
Cwmtydu	Cwmtydu			Area	SN3557
Cwmystwyth	Cwmystwyth			Settlement	SN7874
Cwrtnewydd	Cwrtnewydd			Settlement	SN4847
Derwen-gam	Oakford			Settlement	SN4558
Dihewyd	Dihewyd			Settlement	SN4855
Dole	Dole			Settlement	SN6386
Dôl-y-bont	Dôl-y-bont			Settlement	SN6288
Dre-fach	Dre-fach		Drefach, Ceredigion	Settlement	SN5045
Eglwys-fach	Eglwys-fach		Eglwys Fach	Settlement	SN6895
Felin-fach	Felin-fach			Settlement	SN5255
Felinwnda	Felinwnda		Felin-Wnda	Settlement	SN3246
Felin-wynt	Felin-wynt			Settlement	SN2250
Y Ferwig	Y Ferwig			Settlement	SN1849
Ffair-rhos	Ffair-rhos		Ffair Rhos	Settlement	SN7468
Ffostrasol	Ffostrasol			Settlement	SN3747
Ffos-y-ffin	Ffos-y-ffin			Settlement	SN4460
Ffynnon-oer	Ffynnon-oer			Settlement	SN5353
Gartheli	Gartheli			Settlement	SN5856
Gilfachreda	Gilfachreda		Gilfachrheda	Settlement	SN4058
Glandyfi	Glandyfi			Settlement	SN6996
Glan-wern	Glan-wern		Glan-y-wern	Settlement	SN6188
Glanyrafon	Glanyrafon			Settlement	SN6180
Glynarthen	Glynarthen			Settlement	SN3148
Goginan	Goginan			Settlement	SN6881
Gorrig	Gorrig			Settlement	SN4042
Gors-goch	Gors-goch		Gorsgoch	Settlement	SN4850
Groesffordd	Groesffordd			Settlement	SN4041
Gwbert	Gwbert			Settlement	SN1649
Hawen	Hawen			Settlement	SN3446
Henfynyw	Henfynyw			Settlement	SN4461
Henllan	Henllan			Settlement	SN3540
Highmead	Highmead			Settlement	SN5144
Horeb	Horeb			Settlement	SN3942
Llanafan	Llanafan			Settlement	SN6872
Llanbadarn Fawr	Llanbadarn Fawr			Settlement	SN6080
Llanbedr Pont Steffan	Lampeter			Settlement	SN5748
Llanddeiniol	Llanddeiniol			Settlement	SN5672
Llanddewi Brefi	Llanddewi Brefi			Settlement	SN6655
Llandre	Llandre	Llanfihangel Genau’r-glyn		Settlement	SN6286
Llandyfrïog	Llandyfrïog		Llandyfriog	Settlement	SN3341
Llandygwydd	Llandygwydd			Settlement	SN2443
Llandysul	Llandysul			Settlement	SN4140
Llanfair Clydogau	Llanfair Clydogau			Settlement	SN6251
Llanfarian	Llanfarian			Settlement	SN5877
Llanfihangel-y-Creuddyn	Llanfihangel-y-Creuddyn		Llanfihangel y Creuddyn	Settlement	SN6676
Llangeitho	Llangeitho			Settlement	SN6159
Llangoedmor	Llangoedmor			Settlement	SN2045
Llangorwen	Llangorwen			Settlement	SN6083
Llangrannog	Llangrannog			Settlement	SN3154
Llangwyryfon	Llangwyryfon			Settlement	SN5970
Llangybi	Llangybi			Settlement	SN6053
Llangynfelyn	Llangynfelyn			Settlement	SN6492
Llanilar	Llanilar			Settlement	SN6275
Llanio	Llanio			Settlement	SN6457
Llannarth	Llannarth		Llanarth	Settlement	SN4257
Llannerch Aeron	Llannerch Aeron		Llanerchaeron	Area	SN4760
Llan-non	Llan-non		Llanon	Settlement	SN5167
Llanrhystud	Llanrhystud			Settlement	SN5369
Llansanffraid	Llansanffraid		Llansantffraid	Settlement	SN5167
Llanwenog	Llanwenog			Settlement	SN4945
Llanwnnen	Llanwnnen			Settlement	SN5347
Llechryd	Llechryd			Settlement	SN2143
Lledrod	Lledrod			Settlement	SN6470
Llundain-fach	Llundain-fach			Settlement	SN5556
Llwyncelyn	Llwyncelyn			Settlement	SN4459
Llwyndafydd	Llwyndafydd			Settlement	SN3755
Llwyn-y-groes	Llwyn-y-groes			Settlement	SN5956
Llywernog	Llywernog			Settlement	SN7380
Maen-y-groes	Maen-y-groes			Settlement	SN3858
Maes-llyn	Maes-llyn			Settlement	SN3644
Maesycrugiau	Maesycrugiau			Settlement	SN3652
Maesymeillion	Maesymeillion			Area	SN4245
Moriah	Moriah			Settlement	SN6279
Mwnt	Mwnt			Settlement	SN1951
Mydroilyn	Mydroilyn			Settlement	SN4555
Nantcwnlle	Nantcwnlle			Settlement	SN5758
Nanternis	Nanternis			Settlement	SN3756
Nebo	Nebo			Settlement	SN5465
Neuadd Cross	Neuadd Cross			Settlement	SN2545
Neuadd-lwyd	Neuadd-lwyd			Area	SN4759
Olmarch	Olmarch			Area	SN6255
Pantolwen	Pantolwen			Settlement	SN4141
Pant-y-crug	Pant-y-crug			Settlement	SN6578
Parc-llyn	Parc-llyn			Settlement	SN2451
Pen-bont Rhydybeddau	Pen-bont Rhydybeddau		Pen-bont-rhyd-y-beddau	Settlement	SN6783
Penbryn	Penbryn			Settlement	SN2952
Pen-llwyn	Pen-llwyn			Settlement	SN6580
Pennant	Pennant			Settlement	SN5163
Pen-parc	Pen-parc		Penparc	Settlement	SN2148
Penparcau	Penparcau			Settlement	SN5880
Penrhiw-llan	Penrhiw-llan			Settlement	SN3641
Penrhiwnewydd	Penrhiwnewydd		Pen-Rhiw-Newydd	Settlement	SN6684
Penrhiwpâl	Penrhiwpâl		Penrhiwpal	Settlement	SN3445
Penrhyn-coch	Penrhyn-coch			Settlement	SN6484
Pentre-bach	Pentre-bach			Settlement	SN5547
Pentrefelin	Pentrefelin			Settlement	SN6149
Pentregât	Pentregât		Pentre-gat	Settlement	SN3551
Pentre-llwyn	Pentre-llwyn		Pentrellwyn	Settlement	SN4142
Pentre'r-bryn	Pentre'r-bryn			Settlement	SN3955
Pentre-rhew	Pentre-rhew			Settlement	SN6654
Pen-uwch	Pen-uwch		Penuwch	Area	SN5962
Pen-y-garn	Pen-y-garn			Settlement	SN6285
Pisgah	Pisgah			Settlement	SN6777
Plwmp	Plwmp			Settlement	SN3652
Pontarfynach	Devil's Bridge			Settlement	SN7376
Pontceri	Pontceri		Pont Ceri	Settlement	SN2941
Ponterwyd	Ponterwyd			Settlement	SN7480
Pontgarreg	Pontgarreg			Settlement	SN3354
Pont-hirwaun	Pont-hirwaun		Ponthirwaun	Settlement	SN2645
Pontllanio	Pontllanio			Area	SN6556
Pontrhydfendigaid	Pontrhydfendigaid			Settlement	SN7366
Pont-rhyd-y-groes	Pont-rhyd-y-groes			Settlement	SN7372
Pontsiân	Pontsiân			Settlement	SN4346
Post-mawr	Synod Inn			Settlement	SN4054
Pren-gwyn	Pren-gwyn			Settlement	SN4244
Pwllhobi	Pwllhobi			Settlement	SN6080
Rhos-y-garth	Rhos-y-garth			Settlement	SN6372
Rhuddlan	Rhuddlan			Settlement	SN4943
Rhydgaled	Chancery			Settlement	SN5876
Rhydlewis	Rhydlewis			Settlement	SN3447
Rhydowen	Rhydowen			Settlement	SN4445
Rhydroser	Rhydroser		Rhyd-Rosser	Settlement	SN5667
Rhydyfelin	Rhydyfelin			Settlement	SN5979
Rhydypennau	Rhydypennau			Settlement	SN6285
Salem	Salem			Settlement	SN6684
Sarnau	Sarnau			Settlement	SN3150
Silian	Silian			Settlement	SN5751
Southgate	Southgate			Settlement	SN5979
Staylittle	Staylittle			Settlement	SN6489
Swyddffynnon	Swyddffynnon			Settlement	SN6966
Taigwynion	Taigwynion			Settlement	SN6387
Talgarreg	Talgarreg			Settlement	SN4251
Tal-sarn	Tal-sarn		Talsarn	Settlement	SN5456
Tal-y-bont	Tal-y-bont			Settlement	SN6589
Tan-y-groes	Tan-y-groes			Settlement	SN2849
Temple Bar	Temple Bar			Settlement	SN5354
Tirymynach	Tirymynach			Community	SN6184
Trawsgoed	Trawsgoed			Settlement	SN6673
Tre Taliesin	Tre Taliesin		Tre-Taliesin	Settlement	SN6591
Trefechan	Trefechan			Settlement	SN5881
Trefenter	Trefenter			Settlement	SN6068
Trefilan	Trefilan			Settlement	SN5457
Tregaron	Tregaron			Settlement	SN6759
Tre-groes	Tre-groes		Tregroes	Settlement	SN4044
Tre-main	Tre-main			Settlement	SN2348
Tre'r-ddôl	Tre'r-ddôl			Settlement	SN6692
Tre-saith	Tre-saith		Tresaith	Settlement	SN2751
Trisant	Trisant			Settlement	SN7175
Troed-yr-aur	Troed-yr-aur		Troedyraur	Settlement	SN3245
Tyn'reithin	Tyn'reithin		Ty'n-yr-eithin	Settlement	SN6662
Tyn-y-ffordd	Tyn-y-ffordd			Area	SN7579
Tyn-y-graig	Tyn-y-graig		Ty'n-y-graig	Settlement	SN6969
Waunfawr	Waunfawr			Settlement	SN6081
Waunifor	Waunifor			Area	SN4541
Ynys-las	Ynys-las		Ynyslas	Settlement	SN6092
Ysbyty Ystwyth	Ysbyty Ystwyth			Settlement	SN7371
Ystradaeron	Ystradaeron		Ystrad Aeron	Settlement	SN5255
Ystrad Fflur	Strata Florida			Man-made feature	SN7465
Ystradmeurig	Ystradmeurig		Ystrad Meurig	Settlement	SN7067
Ystumtuen	Ystumtuen			Settlement	SN7378
