= List of United Kingdom locations: Do-Dor =

The United Kingdom

This is part of the list of United Kingdom locations: a gazetteer of place names in the United Kingdom showing each place's locality and geographical coordinates.

== Do ==
=== Dob-Doi ===
Location	Locality	Coordinates (links to map & photo sources)	OS grid reference
Dobcross	Oldham	53.55°N 02.01°W	SD9906
Dobs Hill	Flintshire	53.15°N 03.04°W	SJ3063
Dobson's Bridge	Shropshire	52.90°N 02.75°W	SJ4934
Dobwalls	Cornwall	50.45°N 04.52°W	SX2165
Doccombe	Devon	50.66°N 03.74°W	SX7786
Dochgarroch	Highland	57.42°N 04.31°W	NH6140
Dockeney	Norfolk	52.46°N 01.50°E	TM3891
Dockenfield	Surrey	51.15°N 00.82°W	SU8240
Docker	Lancashire	54.16°N 02.66°W	SD5774
Docking	Norfolk	52.90°N 00.61°E	TF7637
Docklow	Herefordshire	52.20°N 02.64°W	SO5657
Dockray	Cumbria	54.58°N 02.94°W	NY3921
Dockroyd	Bradford	53.83°N 01.95°W	SE0338
Doc Penfro	Pembrokeshire	51.68°N 04.95°W	SM9603
Docton	Devon	50.96°N 04.50°W	SS2421
Dodbrooke	Devon	50.28°N 03.78°W	SX7344
Doddenham	Worcestershire	52.20°N 02.36°W	SO7556
Doddinghurst	Essex	51.65°N 00.29°E	TQ5998
Doddington	Cambridgeshire	52.49°N 00.04°E	TL3990
Doddington	Shropshire	52.38°N 02.57°W	SO6176
Doddington	Kent	51.27°N 00.76°E	TQ9357
Doddington	Northumberland	55.58°N 02.01°W	NT9932
Doddington	Lincolnshire	53.21°N 00.65°W	SK9070
Doddiscombsleigh	Devon	50.66°N 03.62°W	SX8586
Doddshill	Norfolk	52.84°N 00.50°E	TF6930
Doddycross	Cornwall	50.43°N 04.39°W	SX3062
Dodford	Worcestershire	52.35°N 02.10°W	SO9373
Dodford	Northamptonshire	52.23°N 01.10°W	SP6160
Dodington	Somerset	51.15°N 03.18°W	ST1740
Dodington	South Gloucestershire	51.51°N 02.37°W	ST7480
Dodleston	Cheshire	53.13°N 02.95°W	SJ3660
Dodman Point	Cornwall	50.22°N 04.80°W	SX003396
Dodmarsh	Herefordshire	52.08°N 02.62°W	SO5743
Dodscott	Devon	50.95°N 04.08°W	SS5419
Dods Leigh	Staffordshire	52.90°N 01.98°W	SK0134
Dodworth	Barnsley	53.54°N 01.53°W	SE3105
Dodworth Bottom	Barnsley	53.53°N 01.53°W	SE3104
Dodworth Green	Barnsley	53.53°N 01.53°W	SE3104
Doe Bank	Birmingham	52.57°N 01.83°W	SP1197
Doe Green	Cheshire	53.37°N 02.67°W	SJ5587
Doehole	Derbyshire	53.11°N 01.47°W	SK3558
Doe Lea	Derbyshire	53.18°N 01.32°W	SK4566
Doffcocker	Bolton	53.58°N 02.46°W	SD6910
Dogdyke	Lincolnshire	53.07°N 00.19°W	TF2155
Dog & Gun	Liverpool	53.44°N 02.92°W	SJ3995
Dog Hill	Oldham	53.57°N 02.07°W	SD9509
Dogingtree Estate	Staffordshire	52.71°N 02.04°W	SJ9713
Dogley Lane	Kirklees	53.62°N 01.72°W	SE1814
Dogmersfield	Hampshire	51.26°N 00.88°W	SU7852
Dogsthorpe	Cambridgeshire	52.59°N 00.22°W	TF2001
Dog Village	Devon	50.75°N 03.44°W	SX9896
Doirlinn Head	Western Isles	56.96°N 07.54°W	NL629998

=== Dol-Doo ===
Location	Locality	Coordinates (links to map & photo sources)	OS grid reference
Dolanog	Powys	52.69°N 03.39°W	SJ0612
Dolau	Powys	52.29°N 03.26°W	SO1467
Dolau	Rhondda, Cynon, Taff	51.52°N 03.44°W	ST0082
Dolbenmaen	Gwynedd	52.96°N 04.23°W	SH5043
Dole	Ceredigion	52.45°N 04.01°W	SN6386
Dolemeads	Bath and North East Somerset	51.37°N 02.36°W	ST7564
Doley	Staffordshire	52.85°N 02.38°W	SJ7429
Dolfach	Powys	52.59°N 03.61°W	SH9101
Dol-ffanog	Gwynedd	52.67°N 03.89°W	SH7210
Dolfor	Powys	52.47°N 03.32°W	SO1087
Dolgarrog	Conwy	53.18°N 03.84°W	SH7767
Dolgellau	Gwynedd	52.73°N 03.89°W	SH7217
Dolgerdd	Ceredigion	52.12°N 04.30°W	SN4250
Dolgoch	Gwynedd	52.61°N 03.99°W	SH6504
Dolhelfa	Powys	52.34°N 03.58°W	SN9273
Dolhendre	Gwynedd	52.86°N 03.70°W	SH8531
Doll	Highland	58.00°N 03.89°W	NC8803
Dollar	Clackmannan	56.16°N 03.67°W	NS9698
Dolley Green	Powys	52.27°N 03.05°W	SO2865
Dollis Hill	Brent	51.55°N 00.24°W	TQ2286
Dollwen	Ceredigion	52.41°N 03.94°W	SN6881
Dolphin	Flintshire	53.24°N 03.21°W	SJ1973
Dolphingstone	East Lothian	55.93°N 02.99°W	NT3872
Dolphinholme	Lancashire	53.97°N 02.74°W	SD5153
Dolphinston	Scottish Borders	55.42°N 02.50°W	NT6815
Dolphinton	South Lanarkshire	55.69°N 03.43°W	NT1046
Dolton	Devon	50.88°N 04.03°W	SS5712
Dolwen	Conwy	53.25°N 03.68°W	SH8874
Dolwyd	Conwy	53.27°N 03.78°W	SH8177
Dolwyddelan	Conwy	53.05°N 03.89°W	SH7352
Dôl-y-bont	Ceredigion	52.47°N 04.03°W	SN6288
Dol-y-cannau	Powys	52.13°N 03.17°W	SO2049
Dolydd	Gwynedd	53.08°N 04.28°W	SH4757
Dolyhir	Powys	52.20°N 03.11°W	SO2457
Dolymelinau	Powys	52.58°N 03.34°W	SO0999
Dolywern	Wrexham	52.92°N 03.17°W	SJ2137
Domewood	Surrey	51.14°N 00.08°W	TQ3440
Domgay	Powys	52.76°N 03.06°W	SJ2819
Dommett	Somerset	50.92°N 03.02°W	ST2814
Doncaster	Doncaster	53.51°N 01.14°W	SE5702
Doncaster Common	Doncaster	53.51°N 01.09°W	SE6002
Dones Green	Cheshire	53.28°N 02.60°W	SJ6077
Donhead St Andrew	Wiltshire	51.01°N 02.12°W	ST9124
Donhead St Mary	Wiltshire	51.01°N 02.14°W	ST9024
Doniford	Somerset	51.17°N 03.31°W	ST0843
Donington	Lincolnshire	52.89°N 00.20°W	TF2135
Donington	Shropshire	52.63°N 02.28°W	SJ8104
Donington Eaudike	Lincolnshire	52.90°N 00.17°W	TF2336
Donington le Heath	Leicestershire	52.70°N 01.39°W	SK4112
Donington on Bain	Lincolnshire	53.32°N 00.15°W	TF2382
Donington South Ing	Lincolnshire	52.89°N 00.21°W	TF2034
Donisthorpe	Leicestershire	52.72°N 01.54°W	SK3114
Don Johns	Essex	51.92°N 00.65°E	TL8328
Donkey Street	Kent	51.04°N 00.99°E	TR1032
Donkey Town	Surrey	51.33°N 00.66°W	SU9360
Donna Nook	Lincolnshire	53.46°N 00.13°E	TF4299
Donnington	West Sussex	50.81°N 00.79°W	SU8502
Donnington	Gloucestershire	51.95°N 01.72°W	SP1928
Donnington	Herefordshire	51.99°N 02.43°W	SO7033
Donnington	Berkshire	51.40°N 01.33°W	SU4668
Donnington	Shropshire	52.65°N 02.63°W	SJ5707
Donnington	Telford and Wrekin	52.71°N 02.44°W	SJ7013
Donnington Wood	Shropshire	52.70°N 02.44°W	SJ7012
Donwell	Sunderland	54.91°N 01.54°W	NZ2958
Donyatt	Somerset	50.92°N 02.95°W	ST3314
Doomsday Green	West Sussex	51.04°N 00.30°W	TQ1929
Doonfoot	South Ayrshire	55.42°N 04.65°W	NS3218

=== Dor ===
Location	Locality	Coordinates (links to map & photo sources)	OS grid reference
Dora's Green	Hampshire	51.22°N 00.84°W	SU8148
Dorcan	Swindon	51.55°N 01.72°W	SU1984
Dorchester	Dorset	50.70°N 02.45°W	SY6890
Dorchester	Oxfordshire	51.64°N 01.17°W	SU5794
Dordale	Worcestershire	52.36°N 02.11°W	SO9274
Dordon	Warwickshire	52.59°N 01.61°W	SK2600
Dore	Sheffield	53.32°N 01.53°W	SK3181
Dores	Highland	57.37°N 04.34°W	NH5934
Dorking	Surrey	51.22°N 00.33°W	TQ1649
Dorking Tye	Suffolk	51.98°N 00.78°E	TL9136
Dorley's Corner	Suffolk	52.23°N 01.48°E	TM3865
Dormansland	Surrey	51.16°N -00.00°E	TQ4042
Dormans Park	Surrey	51.14°N 00.01°W	TQ3940
Dormanstown	Redcar and Cleveland	54.59°N 01.10°W	NZ5823
Dormer's Wells	Ealing	51.50°N 00.37°W	TQ1380
Dormington	Herefordshire	52.05°N 02.61°W	SO5840
Dormston	Worcestershire	52.21°N 02.03°W	SO9857
Dorn	Gloucestershire	52.00°N 01.71°W	SP2034
Dorney	Buckinghamshire	51.50°N 00.66°W	SU9379
Dorney Reach	Buckinghamshire	51.50°N 00.69°W	SU9179
Dornie	Highland	57.27°N 05.51°W	NG8826
Dornoch	Highland	57.87°N 04.02°W	NH8089
Dornock	Dumfries and Galloway	54.98°N 03.20°W	NY2366
Dorrery	Highland	58.46°N 03.59°W	ND0754
Dorridge	Solihull	52.37°N 01.76°W	SP1675
Dorrington	Lincolnshire	53.05°N 00.40°W	TF0752
Dorrington	Shropshire	52.61°N 02.78°W	SJ4702
Dorsington	Warwickshire	52.13°N 01.81°W	SP1349
Dorstone	Herefordshire	52.06°N 03.00°W	SO3141
Dorton	Buckinghamshire	51.82°N 01.01°W	SP6814
