= Trefeurig =

Community in Ceredigion, Wales

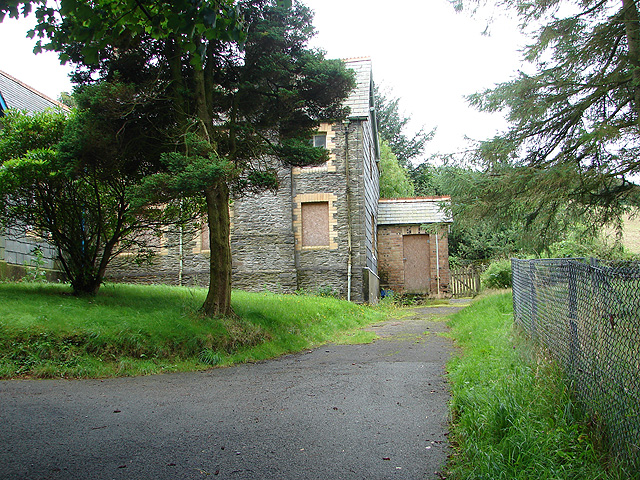
- The Old School of Trefeurig

- Location within Ceredigion
- Population: 1,771 (2011)
- OS grid reference: SN 653841
- Principal area: Ceredigion
- Preserved county: Dyfed
- Country: Wales
- Sovereign state: United Kingdom
- Post town: Aberystwyth
- Postcode district: SY23 3
- Dialling code: 01970
- Police: Dyfed-Powys
- Fire: Mid and West Wales
- Ambulance: Welsh
- UK Parliament: Ceredigion Preseli
- Senedd Cymru – Welsh Parliament: Ceredigion Penfro
- List of places UK Wales Ceredigion 52.4383°N 3.9828°W Community map: Map of the community

Trefeurig is a community in Ceredigion, Wales, situated around 4 miles (6.4 km) north-east of Aberystwyth. It is a site of particular prehistoric, Roman, and Iron Age interest, and has a long history as a mining area. In 2011 the local population was estimated at 1,771 people.

== Boundaries ==
The community boundary encompasses the areas of Penrhyn-coch, Salem, Pen-bont Rhydybeddau, Cwmsymlog, Cwmerfyn, Banc-y-darren, Cefn-llwyd, and Capel Madog.

The community's lowest point lies in the west, and is less than 20m above sea level. This is the point where the Peithyll and Clarach streams meet at Pont Rhyd-hir, and the railway bridge on the A487. The boundary runs along the Nant Clarach for a short distance before climbing through Gogerddan forest, then along the middle below Broncastellan Fort, until reaching the road from Bow Street to Pont-goch.

The boundary continues along Bow Street until turning at Elgar's Farm and travelling along the stream past the old Elgar and Mynyddgorddu mines, and through the old mine reservoir. The border then turns south over Troedrhiwseiri Bank until it reaches the Afon Stewi.

It is at the east, over Garn Bank near Caer Pen y Castell, where the community reaches its highest elevation of 437m above sea level, just north of the summit.

The boundary passes through a forest owned by Natural Resources Wales until reaching the shore of Syfydrin Lake at the eastern end of the community. There it heads south across the moorland until it reaches Ponterwyd Road just west of the Buwch a'r Llo (Cow and Calf) Standing Stones.

It follows the road until reaching Blaenmelindwr Lake and then follows the lane past Llyn Rhosgoch to the front of Cwmerfyn. It follows the southern slopes of the valley towards the sea until reaching the road from Cwmerfyn to Capel Madog. It then climbs past Ysgubornewydd, turning west above the Madog Valley until crossing the road to Pen-llwyn, then crosses the River Peithyll and meets the road to Capel Dewi, Aberystwyth near the Institute of Biological, Environmental and Rural Sciences Ionosphere Research Station.

The border leaves the Pen-llwyn road just before reaching Capel Dewi, and follows the Peithyll River through the small wood of Pwll Crwn to the edge of Pont Rhyd-hir.

The community of Trefeurig is bordered by five communities, Tirymynach, Ceulanmaesmawr, Blaenrheidol, Melindwr, and Vaynor.

== Geography ==
The land at the eastern end of the community, on the outskirts of Elenydd, is largely heathland and mountainous in character. It is mostly open ground except for the pine forests, which were planted by the Forestry Commission starting in the 1930s. Three reservoirs lie on the high ground, Llyn Pantrhydyrebolion (also known as 'Llyn Pendam'), Llyn Blaenmelindwr and Llyn Rhosgoch. The three reservoirs and Pen-Cefn reservoir were built to supply water to the mines. The Angling Association administers the fishing rights on the Rhosgoch and Blaenmelindwr lakes.

As well as the Natural Resources Wales forests, the majority of which are pine, Trefeurig has broadleaved and mixed forests, mostly on steep slopes and on the river banks. Ice Age glaciers deposited shingle on the flat valley floor in the lowlands, and a layer of clay. The remainder of the land is improved pasture, used for grazing sheep and cattle. Some of the land is used in IBERS experiments. Lowland hedges divide the fields in the lowlands, as well as wire fences and some stonewalls in upland areas.

There are five Sites of Special Scientific Interest (SSSI) at Trefeurig. Three of them, Cwmsymlog, Mwyngloddfa Cwmystwyth, and Mwyngloddfa Llechweddhelyg, are in the grounds of the old mine workings. Much of the mine waste was cleared during the 1990s, but some waste still remains, especially at Cwmsymlog. Unusual plants and lichens grow on these sites, consisting of species which can tolerate high levels of metals in the ground.

Banc Llety-spence SSSI is a rare dry heath habitat in Ceredigion. Gwaun Troed-rhiw-seiri and Llyn Mynydd-gorddu by contrast are of interest instead for the rare marshy grassland in the area. SSSIs are typically located on private land, but unusually there is public access at Cwmsymlog.

The community includes the following villages:

- Penrhyn-coch
- Pen-bont-rhyd-y-beddau
- Salem
- Llwyn Prysg
- Pen-rhiw-newydd
- Cwmsymlog
- Cwmerfyn
- Banc-y-Darren
- Cefn Llwyd

There are 5 churches in the community, namely St John's Church (Church in Wales), Horeb Church (Baptist Union of Wales), Salem Church (Congregational Federation in Wales), Siloa Church, Cwmerfyn Church (Independent), Capel Madoc (Calvinistic Methodist). There is a community primary school in Penrhyncoch, as well as Neuadd, a football club that plays on Baker Field and has a social club, a children's playground, and a playground. Pen-bont-rhyd-y-beddau also has a playground. Natural Resources Wales has installed car parks and footpaths in the forests at Gogerddan and Round Pond. They have also installed car parks and cycle and walking trails on the grounds around the lakes in the west of the community.

An Eisteddfod and Show are held annually at Penrhyncoch Hall.

=== Climate ===
The Gogerddan Weather Monitoring Station opened in 1953, near to the present day site of IBERS. Since 1959, the highest recorded temperature at the weather station was 35.8 °C (96.4 °F) on 18 July 2022 and the lowest was −12.4 °C (9.7 °F) on 13 December 1981.

Temperatures reached 26.2 °C (79.2 °F) on 16 April 2003, which is the warmest April temperature recorded in Wales.

Climate data for Gogerddan, elevation 31m, 1991–2020, extremes 1959-present
Month	Jan	Feb	Mar	Apr	May	Jun	Jul	Aug	Sep	Oct	Nov	Dec	Year
Record high °C (°F)	16.1 (61.0)	20.5 (68.9)	22.8 (73.0)	26.2 (79.2)	27.9 (82.2)	31.3 (88.3)	35.8 (96.4)	32.8 (91.0)	31.1 (88.0)	26.1 (79.0)	21.5 (70.7)	16.4 (61.5)	35.8 (96.4)
Mean daily maximum °C (°F)	8.4 (47.1)	8.6 (47.5)	10.4 (50.7)	12.9 (55.2)	15.7 (60.3)	18.0 (64.4)	19.5 (67.1)	19.3 (66.7)	17.6 (63.7)	14.5 (58.1)	11.3 (52.3)	9.0 (48.2)	13.8 (56.8)
Daily mean °C (°F)	5.5 (41.9)	5.6 (42.1)	7.0 (44.6)	9.0 (48.2)	11.7 (53.1)	14.2 (57.6)	16.0 (60.8)	15.9 (60.6)	14.0 (57.2)	11.3 (52.3)	8.2 (46.8)	6.0 (42.8)	10.4 (50.7)
Mean daily minimum °C (°F)	2.7 (36.9)	2.6 (36.7)	3.6 (38.5)	5.0 (41.0)	7.6 (45.7)	10.4 (50.7)	12.5 (54.5)	12.4 (54.3)	10.3 (50.5)	8.1 (46.6)	5.1 (41.2)	3.0 (37.4)	7.0 (44.6)
Record low °C (°F)	−12.2 (10.0)	−11.1 (12.0)	−9.4 (15.1)	−5.1 (22.8)	−2.6 (27.3)	0.6 (33.1)	2.8 (37.0)	2.8 (37.0)	0.0 (32.0)	−4.3 (24.3)	−7.4 (18.7)	−12.4 (9.7)	−12.4 (9.7)
Average precipitation mm (inches)	102.9 (4.05)	81.7 (3.22)	74.1 (2.92)	63.0 (2.48)	62.5 (2.46)	81.0 (3.19)	85.6 (3.37)	85.8 (3.38)	96.6 (3.80)	122.9 (4.84)	123.5 (4.86)	126.9 (5.00)	1,106.5 (43.56)
Average precipitation days (≥ 1.0 mm)	15.9	13.0	12.5	11.4	10.4	11.1	12.6	12.7	13.0	15.5	17.6	17.0	162.7
Mean monthly sunshine hours	51.1	71.5	112.2	170.4	208.5	187.9	184.3	164.4	133.2	97.0	55.4	43.8	1,479.7
Source 1: Met Office
Source 2: Starlings Roost Weather

== Geology ==
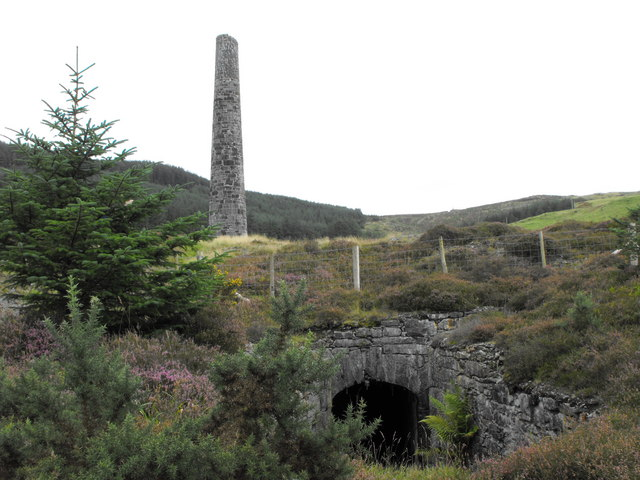
Chimney of the old Cwmsymlog mine

The rocks in Trefeurig have been dated to the early Silurian period, including mudstones and silt.

Several rock bends occurred from the Devonian to the Permian eras, which caused faults to appear in the rock. The faults became filled with hot fluid pressed through the cracks from the ground below. These faults are now filled by quartz, with some amounts of lead, silver, zinc, and copper. The percentage of minerals differs from vein to vein. The Cwmsymlog vein is relatively heavy in silver and the Daren vein is relatively heavy in copper.

== History ==
=== The prehistoric period ===
There are traces of people living near Trefeurig since the New Stone Age. In 1986, archaeologists excavated a site on Gogerddan land in the triangular field between the A4159 and IBERS, and discovered burial and ceremony sites, used from the Neolithic to the Early Middle Ages. The earliest traces found were in a pit, and included burnt grain, indicating the presence of farming nearby. There were also standing stones, round barrows, post-holes, Iron Age cremation remains, Early Medieval graves, and cellular remains.

We know that the standing stone, and other standing stones on the other side of the highway, were used by the Gogerddan family to mark the starting line of horse races which were held during the 18th century. As a result, this raises questions about whether the other uncovered standing stones have indeed stood there since prehistory, or whether they are more contemporary in nature. Other standing stones have occasionally been found in the community grounds, including Garreg Hir (Grid Ref SN703835) and Cerrig-yr-Wyn (Grid Ref SN685836). In 1923 a quartz standing stone was moved from Fanc Troed-rhiw-seiri to the village square to serve as a memorial to the dead of the First World War.

The ring barrow near the original site of the standing stones was excavated in 1955, finding an Early Bronze Age grave, and a Roman cremation. A pile of stones on Baker's Field had already been excavated in 1851 when clearing the mound to plow the field. The farmer found bones, a metal brooch pen, and an earthenware vessel that broke down when touched. Flints and other primitive tools have occasionally been found in the Plas Gogerddan valley.

In 1994 a pit and burnt stones were discovered at Penrhyn-Canol, about 40m south of the Seilo Brook (Grid Ref. SN642839). It is thought that the pit would have contained a burnt mound during the Bronze Age, but plowing has since meant these remains have been demolished. Another burnt mound was identified in the Sebon Valley. There are also a number of cairns at Trefeurig, including Garn Wen on Fanc Cwm-isaf, Dolgau cairn on Fanc Trawsnant and cairns at Nghaer Daren.

When Lewis Morris came to Cwmsymlog in the mid-18th century, he reported seeing the remains of an old mining method at Twll-y-Mwyn, Cwmsebon, and stone tools that he claimed had belonged to prehistoric miners. As these artefacts were not available by the 20th century, there is considerable uncertainty about these claims.

Since the late 20th century a number of Bronze Age ore mines in Wales have been discovered by new archaeological works, most of them at Elenydd. In 2005 additional stone hammers were found on the edge of the Twllymwyn works, along with other evidence which confirms that mining took place there in the Bronze Age.

Hillforts were established at Trefeurig during the Iron Age, at Pen-gaer above the bus yard, and at Daren. An outline of another fort emerged near Alltfadog during an aerial survey.

Sarn Helen crosses Trefeurig on the road between the Roman forts of Penllwyn on the banks of the Rheidol, through the Middle Peninsula and past the Courtyard, to Talybont. In 1998 a hoard of Roman coins was discovered by the road near Salem. It is thought to have been hidden in the last decade of the third century AD. The money is on display at Ceredigion Museum in Aberystwyth.

=== Contemporary ===
During the Norman invasion of northern Ceredigion in the early 12th century, Ystrad Peithyll Castle (Grid Ref SN623824) was built, and a wooden tower was placed on top of a mound surrounded with a ditch. The castle was burnt by Gruffydd ap Rhys' army during the rebellion of 1116.

During the Middle Ages, Trefeurig belonged to the Hundred of Penweddig. The Hundred has been divided into 3 commotes, including Genoedd Glyn (north of the River Clarach) and Perfedd (south of the Clarach). Under Roman rule, Trefeurig was part of the parish of Llanbadarn Fawr. Because the parish was so large, it was divided into townships or administrative parcels, including Trefeurig township. At that time Trefeurig extended past Pumlumon, including some land in Powys today.

In 1894 civil parishes were established in Britain, including Trefeurig Parish, each with its own parish council. Parish council oversight included road repairs, preserving old shafts left open when the mines were closed and supplying clean water to residents. The Parish Council was responsible for the construction of the Ty'n-celli bridge across the Nant Seilo in 1924, but by the time the new bridge was built in 1991 many of the responsibilities of parish councils had been transferred to the county councils. The bridge of 1991 was therefore at the expense of the County Council.

The title of Trefeurig changed from the Parish of Trefeurig to the Community of Trefeurig in 1972, under the Local Government Act 1972. Community boundaries were reorganized in 1987, slightly extending the parish boundaries north of the Clarach and Stewi Rivers, and south of the former Middle Parcel lands, and significantly reducing the eastern boundary of the parish.

== 2011 census ==
At the 2011 census the position was as follows:

Statistic (ONS)	Trefeurig	%	Wales	%
Population	1,771	100	3,196,800	100
Welsh speakers (age 3 and above)	967	56.5%	607,392	19%
Residents born in Wales	1,151	65%	2,333,664	73%
16 - 64 year olds in work	208	28%	2,145,053	67.1%

== People from Trefeurig ==
- Dafydd ap Gwilym - poet. Born in Brogynin on the banks of the River Stewi. Many local place-names appear in his poems, such as Cwmbwa and Gogerddan.
- Lewis Morris - hydrographer, writer, scholar. Moved to Trefeurig upon appointment as Crown Steward of Mid Wales Mines. He lived in Cwmsymlog, later moving between 1746 and Gelffadog as well as Penrhyn-coch in 1757.
- Sir Carbery Pryse - Resided at Gogerddan, and owned a number of mines.
- David Jenkins - librarian, author. Lived at Penrhyn-coch since childhood.
- Niall Griffiths - author. Chose to move to Penrhyn-coch.
- Linda Griffiths - singer.
- Daniel Huws - scholar.

== Films and filming location ==
- Sleep Furiously (2007)
- Hinterland (Y Gwyll) (2013)

== Bibliography ==
- Jenkins, David (1992). Bro Dafydd ap Gwilym. Ceredigion Book Society.
- Davies, Elfed and Davies, Brian (2012). Salem Soldier. Y Lolfa Cyf.
