= Rhiannon Davies Jones =

Welsh author and lecturer

- Born: 4 November 1921; Llanbedr, Merioneth, Wales
- Died: 22 October 2014 (aged 92); Holyhead, Anglesey, Wales
- Occupations: Historical novelist; Lecturer; Welsh nationalist
- Years active: 1952–2002

Rhiannon Davies Jones (4 November 1921 – 22 October 2014) was a Welsh historical novelist, lecturer and Welsh nationalist who wrote in Welsh. Educated at University College Bangor, she won two prizes for short novels, two Prose Medals at the National Eisteddfod of Wales and the crown at the 1973 Anglesey Eisteddfod. Jones published ten novels with her works covering fictional diaries, her political beliefs and responses to political events, and Welsh kings and princes.

== Biography ==
=== Early life and education ===
Jones was born at Meirion House in Llanbedr, Meirioneth on 4 November 1921, to the former Baptist minister of Salem chapel Hugh Davies Jones and his wife, the teacher Laura Jones (née Owen). She was the second child in the family after her elder sister Annie Davies Evans (née Jones). After the death of Jones' father when she was two years old, the family moved from their home in Oswestry, Shropshire and went to live with her maternal grandmother in Penbont, Llanbedr.

She was educated at Llanbedr Primary School, Llanfair Primary School and Barmouth Grammar School, where the headmaster introduced her to the history of Christendom. In 1940, Jones moved on to University College Bangor, where she met Ifor Williams, Thomas Parry, and Robert Thomas Jenkins. She graduated with a Certificate of Education in 1945.

=== Career ===
That same year, Jones was employed as a teacher of Welsh at Brynhyfryd Grammar School, Rhuthin. There, she began writing with the support of acquaintances with literary interests in Rhuthin. Parry advised Jones to choose between poetry and prose without mixing the two. In 1963, Jones was appointed to a lectureship at College of Education in Monmouthshire, before moving on to teach the same subject at Bangor Normal College two years later, remaining there until she retired in 1983.

She earned prizes for short novels that eventually went unpublished at the 1952 and 1956 editions of the National Eisteddfod of Wales. In 1960, Jones authored Fy Hen Lyfr Cownt ('My old account book'), which is centred on a fictional diary about the final ten years of the hymn writer Ann Griffiths. This won her the 1960 Prose Medal at the National Eisteddfod, the first of her career, and the novel is credited by Meic Stephens of The Independent as having "gathered a momentum that it has maintained to the present day." Jones won a second Prose Medal at the 1964 National Eisteddfod for the novel Lleian Llan Llŷr (The Nun of Llan Llŷr), which is focused on the grief she felt over the death of her partner. This was followed by Llys Aberffraw (The Court of Aberffraw), a novel about Owain Gwynedd's illegitimate granddaughters. As a Welsh nationalist, Jones was inspired to write the novel after learning of the Investiture of Prince Charles as Prince of Wales and the deaths of two young nationalists who were killed by their own bomb in Abergele on the eve of the investiture. The novel won the crown at the 1973 Anglesey Eisteddfod and was published four years later.

In 1981, Eryr Pengwern ('The eagle of Pengwern'), set in 7th-century Powys and based on the Heledd Saga, was written by Jones in response to Gwynfor Evans' threat to launch a hunger strike for a Welsh television channel. Four years later, she moved to journal form with the novel in Dyddiadur Mari Gwyn (Mari Gwyn’s Diary) dealing with the persecution of Catholics in Elizabeth I's reign and focusing on the Elizabethan Welsh writer Robert Gwyn. This was followed by Jones authoring a trilogy of novels between 1987 and 1993 which were set in the Age of the Princes: Cribau Eryri (The Ridges of Snowdonia), Barrug y Bore (Morning Frost) and Adar Drycin (Storm Birds). She was inspired to write the trilogy after the failed 1979 Welsh devolution referendum, and an increase of demographic pressure in the Welsh language central areas. Jones' final novel Cydio Mewn Cwilsyn (Taking up a Quill), a factious diary of Edmund Prys' daughter, was published in 2002. She wrote ten novels over her lifetime and published a collection of original children's nursery rhymes.

=== Death ===
Jones died on 22 October 2014, in Penrhos Stanley Hospital, Holyhead, Anglesey, after a long illness from pneumonia and a broken femur. She was unmarried. Jones was given a funeral service at Penuel Baptist Chapel in Bangor and was buried at Salem Baptist Chapel in Llansilin, Denbighshire on 30 October.

== Analysis and legacy ==
In the book Rebirth of a Nation: Wales, 1880-1980, author Kenneth O. Morgan wrote, "the historical novel flourished" with authors such as Jones. Haf Llewelyn, writing in her entry in the Dictionary of Welsh Biography, noted Jones' "passionate interest in her subjects is evident from the detailed research" was "the hallmark of her work" and "her beliefs and responses to political events of the period are clearly reflected in her work" Mair Williams of Transceltic said her works featured historical accuracies to "impart powerful nationalist ideals." Jones was added to the Oxford Dictionary of National Biography in 2018.
