= Llandysiliogogo =

Community in Ceredigion, Wales

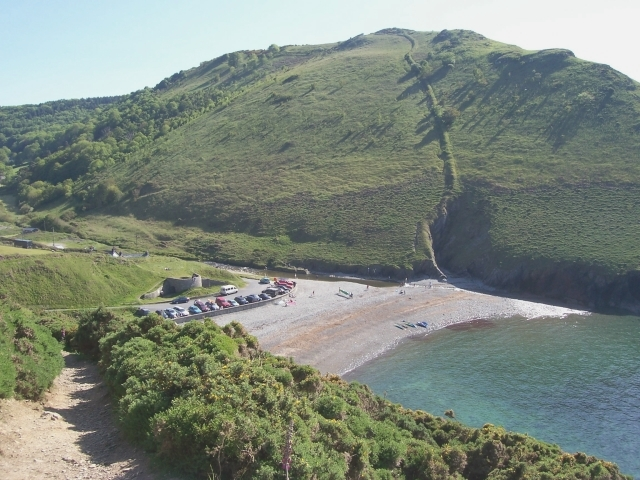
- Cwmtydu Beach

- Location within Ceredigion
- Population: 1,131
- OS grid reference: SN389568
- Community: Llandysiliogogo
- Principal area: Ceredigion
- Country: Wales
- Sovereign state: United Kingdom
- Post town: Llandysul
- Police: Dyfed-Powys
- Fire: Mid and West Wales
- Ambulance: Welsh
- UK Parliament: Ceredigion Preseli
- Senedd Cymru – Welsh Parliament: Ceredigion Penfro
- List of places UK Wales Ceredigion 52.1865°N 4.3572°W Community map: Map of the community

Llandysiliogogo is a community in the county of Ceredigion, Wales, and includes the villages of Caerwedros, Plwmp, and Talgarreg, and the hamlets of Blaenbedw Fawr, Crugyreryr, Bwlchyfadfa, Dolgerdd, Hafodiwan, Llwyndafydd, and Penbontrhydyfothau. It lies 70 miles (113 km) north-west of Cardiff and 187 miles (301 km) from London.

In 2011 the population of Llandysiliogogo was 1131 with 53.4% of them able to speak Welsh.

There are a number of Celtic round barrows in the community dating back to the Iron Age.

== See also ==
- List of localities in Wales by population
