= Moelona =

Welsh writer, called Moelona

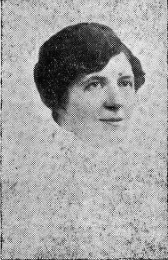
- Lizzie Mary Jones, from a 1917 newspaper.
- Born: Eliza Mary Owen; 21 June 1877; Moylon, Rhydlewis, Cardiganshire, Wales
- Died: 5 June 1953 (aged 75); New Quay, Cardiganshire, Wales
- Other names: Elizabeth Mary Jones (after marriage), Lizzie Jones
- Occupations: Writer, novelist, translator

Moelona was the pen-name of Elizabeth (Lizzie) Mary Jones (née Owen) (21 June 1877 – 5 June 1953), a Welsh novelist and translator who wrote novels for children and other works in Welsh.

== Early life ==
She was born at Rhydlewis, Ceredigion, the youngest of thirteen children, on a farm called "Moylon", hence her choice of pseudonym. Her parents were John Owen and Mary James Owen. She went to school at Rhydlewis, one of her schoolmates being Caradoc Evans. In 1890 she became a pupil-teacher, the need to care for her widowed father preventing her from obtaining any tertiary education.

== Career ==
=== Fiction ===
Moelona taught school as a young woman, at Pontrhydyfen, Bridgend, and Acrefair. She moved to Cardiff in 1905. She wrote her first novel (Rhamant o Ben y Rhos) for an eisteddfod in 1907, but it was not published until 1918 (as Rhamant y Rhos). In 1911 she published two romance novellas, Rhamant Nyrs Bivan (Nurse Bevan's Romance) and Alys Morgan. She won a prize at the National Eisteddfod for another work of fiction, a didactic novella titled Teulu Bach Nantoer (The Little Family of Nantoer) in 1912; after it was published the next year, it became a popular Welsh-language children's book for many years.

In her novel Bugail y Bryn (1917) she evokes the Welsh dialect of south Cardiganshire, with an explanatory note (before page 1) of the most common distinctive features. Cwrs y lli (The Course of the Stream, 1927), a desert-island adventure Breuddwydion Myfanwy (The Dreams of Myfanwy, 1928) and Beryl (1931) were considered "girls' novels". Her last novel was Ffynnonloyw (Bright Spring, 1939), in which the characters exemplify the progress Welsh women experienced in the early twentieth century.

=== Translation, lectures, journalism ===
Moelona joined a British-French Society in Cardiff, and became acquainted with the works of Alphonse Daudet, several of which she translated for Welsh-language periodicals, and published as Y wers olaf (The Last Lesson, 1921). Her husband was also a writer, and encouraged her in her writing career by making her the children's columnist on Y Darian, a periodical which he edited. She also wrote a women's column for the paper beginning in 1919; she encouraged women to read more about current events, to prepare for the vote. She gave a lecture on "The Novel" at the second meeting of the Celtic Society at Aberystwyth in 1923. She also wrote two textbooks in Welsh, Priffordd Llên (1924) and Storïau o Hanes Cymru (1930).

== Personal life ==
In 1917, Lizzie Owen married a widowed Baptist minister and editor, John Tywi Jones, in Cardiff. His daughters Sophie and Gwyneth lived with them in Glais, Swansea. The couple lived in New Quay, Ceredigion, from 1935 until their respective deaths in 1949 and 1953. Her grave is in Rhydlewis. A collection of her letters, scrapbooks, and manuscripts are archived in the National Library of Wales.

== Works ==
- Teulu Bach Nantoer (1913)
- Bugail y Bryn (1917)
- Rhamant y Rhos (1918)
- Cwrs y Lli (1927)
- Breuddwydion Myfanwy (1928)
- Beryl (1931)
- Ffynnonloyw (1939)
