= Pentrebach (disambiguation) =

Pentrebach is a village in Merthyr Tydfil County Borough, Wales.

Pentre Bach is a Welsh language television programme for young children.

Pentrebach, Pentre-bach or Pentre Bach (meaning Small village in English) can also refer to:

- Pentre-bach, Powys, a hamlet in Powys, Wales
- Pentre-bach, Ceredigion, a small village in Lampeter, Ceredigion, Wales
- Pentrebach, Swansea, a village in City and County of Swansea, Wales
- Pentrebach, Rhondda Cynon Taf a village in Coedpenmaen, Pontypridd district, Rhondda Cynon Taf, Wales
- Pentre-bach railway station, Merthyr Tydfil, Wales
