= Melindwr =

Community in Ceredigion, Wales

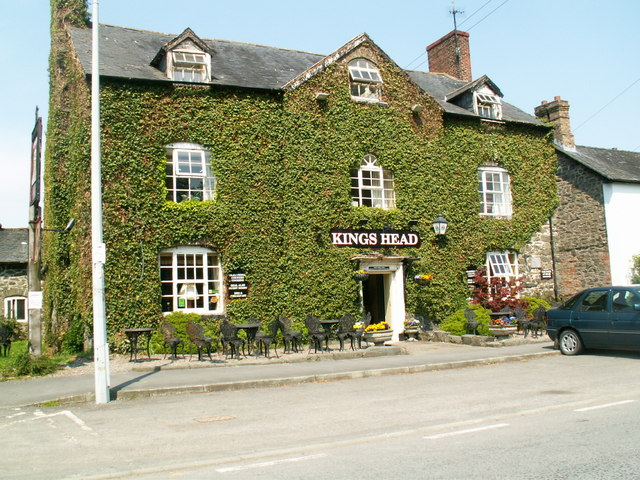

- Location within Ceredigion
- Population: 1,070
- OS grid reference: SN 679 799
  - Cardiff: 71.6 mi (115.2 km)
  - London: 173.8 mi (279.7 km)
- Community: Melindwr
- Principal area: Ceredigion
- Country: Wales
- Sovereign state: United Kingdom
- Post town: Aberystwyth
- Postcode district: SY23
- Police: Dyfed-Powys
- Fire: Mid and West Wales
- Ambulance: Welsh
- UK Parliament: Ceredigion Preseli
- Senedd Cymru – Welsh Parliament: Ceredigion Penfro
- List of places UK Wales Ceredigion 52.401107°N 3.943803°W Community map: Map of the community

Melindwr is a community in the county of Ceredigion, Wales, to the east of Aberystwyth and is 71.6 miles (115.1 km) from Cardiff and 173.8 miles (279.7 km) from London. In 2011 the population of Melindwr was 1070 with 54.7% of them able to speak Welsh.

Villages within this community include: Capel Bangor, Goginan, Pisgah, Cwmbrwyno, Pant-y-crug, Maes-bangor, Dollwen, Dol-y-pandy, Blaen-geuffordd and Pen-llwyn. The Afon Rheidol runs through the community.

Buwch a'r Llo Standing Stones (lit. 'Cow and Calf') is a standing stone within the community; 52.4329°N 3.8815°W. Goginan mine, is a pre-Roman (Celtic) lead and zinc mine which is also situated in Melindwr community.

== Governance ==
An electoral ward in the same name exists. This stretches beyond the confines of Melindwr Community. The total population at the 2011 Census was 2020.

== See also ==
- List of localities in Wales by population
