= Bryndioddef-isaf =

Village in Ceredigion, Wales

Coordinates: 52.04723°N 4.4633°W

- Location within Ceredigion
- OS grid reference: SN 3117 4162
  - Cardiff: 67.6 mi (108.8 km)
  - London: 189.1 mi (304.3 km)
- Community: Llandyfriog
- Principal area: Ceredigion
- Country: Wales
- Sovereign state: United Kingdom
- Post town: Newcastle Emlyn
- Postcode district: SA38
- Police: Dyfed-Powys
- Fire: Mid and West Wales
- Ambulance: Welsh
- UK Parliament: Ceredigion Preseli
- Senedd Cymru – Welsh Parliament: Ceredigion

Bryndioddef-isaf is a hamlet in the community of Llandyfriog, Ceredigion, Wales, which is 67.6 miles (108.8 km) from Cardiff and 189.1 miles (304.2 km) from London. Bryndioddef-isaf is represented in the Senedd by Elin Jones (Plaid Cymru) and is part of the Ceredigion Preseli constituency in the House of Commons.

== See also ==
- List of localities in Wales by population
