= Maes-bangor =

Village in Ceredigion, Wales

Coordinates: 52.403356°N 3.969828°W

- Location within Ceredigion
- OS grid reference: SN 6609 8020
  - Cardiff: 72.2 mi (116.2 km)
  - London: 174.9 mi (281.5 km)
- Community: Melindwr
- Principal area: Ceredigion
- Country: Wales
- Sovereign state: United Kingdom
- Post town: Aberystwyth
- Postcode district: SY23
- Police: Dyfed-Powys
- Fire: Mid and West Wales
- Ambulance: Welsh
- UK Parliament: Ceredigion Preseli
- Senedd Cymru – Welsh Parliament: Ceredigion

Maes-bangor is a hamlet in the community of Melindwr, Ceredigion, Wales, which is 72.2 miles (116.1 km) from Cardiff and 174.9 miles (281.4 km) from London. Maes-bangor is represented in the Senedd by Elin Jones (Plaid Cymru) and is part of the Ceredigion Preseli constituency in the House of Commons.

== See also ==
- Bangor - city in North Wales
- List of localities in Wales by population
