= Cwmerfyn =

Village in Ceredigion, Wales

Coordinates: 52.428093°N 3.915157°W

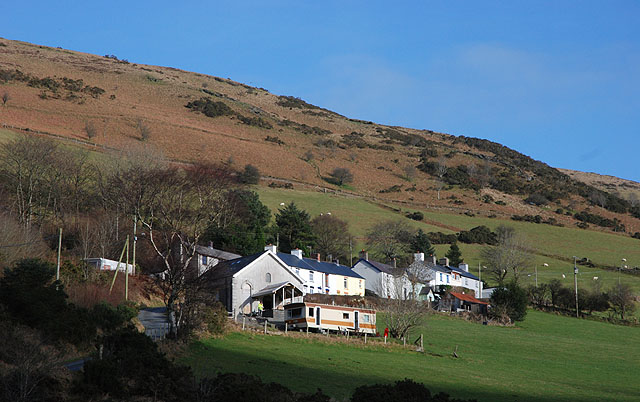

- Location within Ceredigion
- OS grid reference: SN 6988 8285
  - Cardiff: 72.7 mi (117.0 km)
  - London: 173.3 mi (278.9 km)
- Community: Trefeurig
- Principal area: Ceredigion
- Country: Wales
- Sovereign state: United Kingdom
- Post town: Aberystwyth
- Postcode district: SY23
- Police: Dyfed-Powys
- Fire: Mid and West Wales
- Ambulance: Welsh
- UK Parliament: Ceredigion Preseli
- Senedd Cymru – Welsh Parliament: Ceredigion

Cwmerfyn (historically Cwm-erfin or Cwmerfin) is a hamlet in the community of Trefeurig, Ceredigion, Wales, nine miles (14 km) by road east of Aberystwyth. Historically Cwmerfyn was a lead ore mining village.

== Geography ==
The Nant Silo stream runs in the vicinity. To the northeast are the small lakes Llyn Rhosgoch, Llyn Blaenmelindwr and Llyn Pendam, to the east of Cwmsymlog.

== Politics ==
Cwmerfyn is represented in the Senedd by Elin Jones (Plaid Cymru) and is part of the Ceredigion Preseli constituency in the House of Commons.

== Landmarks ==
Siloa Chapel in Cwmefyn was built in 1866, as part of a series of churches founded by Azariah Shadrach in north Ceredigion in the Congregational Church of Salem Coedgruffydd. It was known locally as Capel Ucha (the Higher Chapel) to distinguish it from the Bethlehem Presbyterian chapel further down the village, known as Capel Isa (the Lower Chapel). The first minister of the church was Reverend W. Jansen Davies. The chapel is described by Coflein as having a "simple round-headed style, with a rendered exterior and slate roof with bracketed eaves". The chapel has a central double panelled door with a fanlight.

Cwmerfin lead mine is of prehistoric origin and was owned in the first half of the seventeenth century by Sir Hugh Myddelton (1560–1631) and Thomas Bushell (c.1593–1674). As well as lead ore the mine produced zinc, copper and silver ore. The mine closed in 1889.

== See also ==
- List of localities in Wales by population
