= Glyncaled =

Village in Ceredigion, Wales

Coordinates: 52.04415°N 4.387209°W

- Location within Ceredigion
- OS grid reference: SN 3638 4111
  - Cardiff: 65 mi (105 km)
  - London: 186 mi (299 km)
- Community: Llandyfriog
- Principal area: Ceredigion
- Country: Wales
- Sovereign state: United Kingdom
- Post town: Llandysul
- Postcode district: SA44
- Police: Dyfed-Powys
- Fire: Mid and West Wales
- Ambulance: Welsh
- UK Parliament: Ceredigion Preseli
- Senedd Cymru – Welsh Parliament: Ceredigion

Glyncaled is a hamlet in the community of Llandyfriog, Ceredigion, Wales, which is 65 miles (105 km) from Cardiff and 186 mi (299 km) from London. Glyncaled is represented in the Senedd by Elin Jones (Plaid Cymru) and is part of the Ceredigion Preseli constituency in the House of Commons.

== See also ==
- List of localities in Wales by population
