= Troedyraur =

Village and community in Ceredigion, Wales

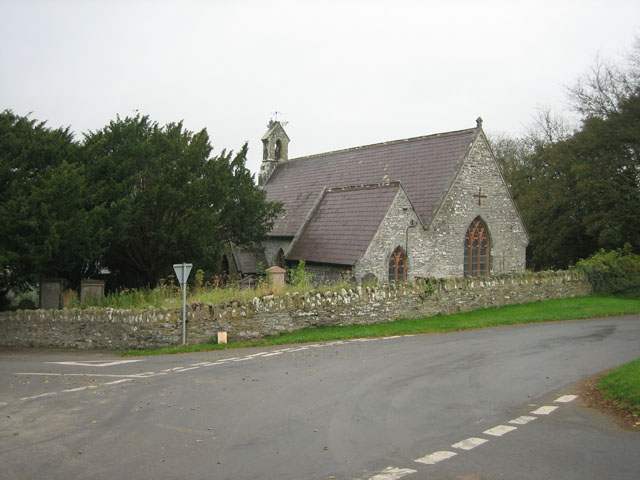
- St Michael's church
- Population: 1,310
- Principal area: Ceredigion
- Preserved county: Dyfed
- Country: Wales
- Sovereign state: United Kingdom
- Police: Dyfed-Powys
- Fire: Mid and West Wales
- Ambulance: Welsh
- UK Parliament: Ceredigion Preseli
- Senedd Cymru – Welsh Parliament: Ceredigion Penfro
- List of places UK Wales Ceredigion Community map: Map of the community

Troedyraur is a small village, wider rural community and electoral ward in Ceredigion, Wales. The community consisting of several small villages, the population as of the 2011 UK Census was 1,310.

The village is on a minor road about 3 miles (5 km) to the north of Newcastle Emlyn. Other villages in the Community are Rhydlewis, Ffostrasol, Brongest, Capel Cynon, Coed-y-bryn, Croes-lan, Penrhiwpâl and Llangynllo.

The main river flowing through the community is the Afon Ceri, a tributary of the river Teifi.

There is a hillfort, Dinas Cerdin, and the ruined mansion of Bronwydd.

Troedyraur is represented at local level by Troed-yr-aur Community Council, which consists of ten community councillors. The ward of Troedyraur also elects one county councillor to Ceredigion County Council.
