= Blaenbedw Fawr =

Village in Ceredigion, Wales

Coordinates: 52.138689°N 4.384886°W

- Location within Ceredigion
- OS grid reference: SN 3689 5161
  - Cardiff: 68.9 mi (110.9 km)
  - London: 187 mi (301 km)
- Community: Llandysiliogogo
- Principal area: Ceredigion
- Country: Wales
- Sovereign state: United Kingdom
- Post town: Llandysul
- Postcode district: SA44
- Police: Dyfed-Powys
- Fire: Mid and West Wales
- Ambulance: Welsh
- UK Parliament: Ceredigion Preseli
- Senedd Cymru – Welsh Parliament: Ceredigion

Blaenbedw Fawr is a small village in the community of Llandysiliogogo, Ceredigion, Wales, which is 68.9 miles (110.8 km) from Cardiff and 187 miles (300.9 km) from London. Blaenbedw Fawr is represented in the Senedd by Elin Jones (Plaid Cymru) and is part of the Ceredigion Preseli constituency in the House of Commons.

== See also ==
- List of localities in Wales by population
