= Berthyfedwen =

Village in Ceredigion, Wales

Coordinates: 52.042252°N 4.417084°W

- Location within Ceredigion
- OS grid reference: SN 3433 4096
  - Cardiff: 65.8 mi (105.9 km)
  - London: 187.1 mi (301.1 km)
- Community: Llandyfriog
- Principal area: Ceredigion
- Country: Wales
- Sovereign state: United Kingdom
- Post town: Newcastle Emlyn
- Postcode district: SA38
- Police: Dyfed-Powys
- Fire: Mid and West Wales
- Ambulance: Welsh
- UK Parliament: Ceredigion Preseli
- Senedd Cymru – Welsh Parliament: Ceredigion

Berthyfedwen is a small village in the community of Llandyfriog, Ceredigion, Wales, which is 65.8 miles (105.9 km) from Cardiff and 187.1 miles (301 km) from London. Berthyfedwen is represented in the Senedd by Elin Jones (Plaid Cymru) and is part of the Ceredigion Preseli constituency in the House of Commons.

== See also ==
- List of localities in Wales by population
