= Dol-y-pandy =

Village in Ceredigion, Wales

Coordinates: 52.402041°N 3.970717°W

Dol-y-pandy: Welsh: Dôl-y-pandy
- Location within Ceredigion
- OS grid reference: SN 6602 8005
  - Cardiff: 72.1 mi (116.0 km)
  - London: 174.9 mi (281.5 km)
- Community: Melindwr
- Principal area: Ceredigion
- Country: Wales
- Sovereign state: United Kingdom
- Post town: Aberystwyth
- Postcode district: SY23
- Police: Dyfed-Powys
- Fire: Mid and West Wales
- Ambulance: Welsh
- UK Parliament: Ceredigion Preseli
- Senedd Cymru – Welsh Parliament: Ceredigion

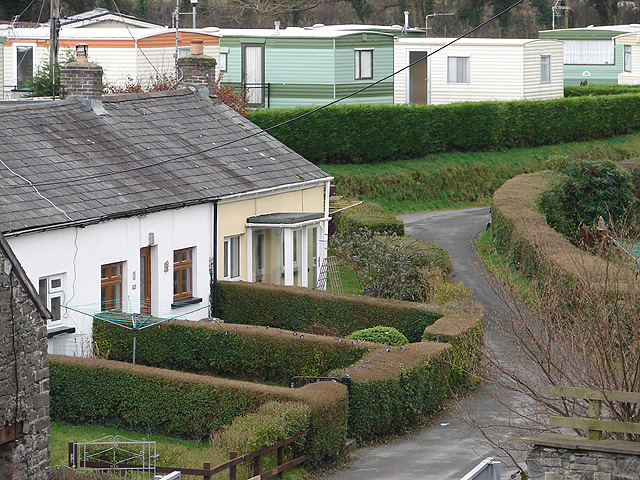
Cottages & Caravans in Dolypandy, 2008

Dol-y-pandy is a hamlet in the community of Melindwr, Ceredigion, Wales, which is 72.1 miles (116 km) from Cardiff and 174.9 miles (281.5 km) from London. Dol-y-pandy is represented in the Senedd by Elin Jones (Plaid Cymru) and is part of the Ceredigion Preseli constituency in the House of Commons.

== See also ==
- List of localities in Wales by population
