= Crugyreryr =

Village in Ceredigion, Wales

Coordinates: 52.128937°N 4.305455°W

- Location within Ceredigion
- OS grid reference: SN 4229 5035
  - Cardiff: 65.9 mi (106.1 km)
  - London: 183.5 mi (295.3 km)
- Community: Llandysiliogogo
- Principal area: Ceredigion
- Country: Wales
- Sovereign state: United Kingdom
- Post town: Llandysul
- Postcode district: SA44
- Police: Dyfed-Powys
- Fire: Mid and West Wales
- Ambulance: Welsh
- UK Parliament: Ceredigion Preseli
- Senedd Cymru – Welsh Parliament: Ceredigion

Crugyreryr is a hamlet in the community of Llandysiliogogo, Ceredigion, Wales, which is 65.9 miles (106 km) from Cardiff and 183.5 miles (295.3 km) from London. Crugyreryr is represented in the Senedd by Elin Jones (Plaid Cymru) and is part of the Ceredigion Preseli constituency in the House of Commons.

== Etymology ==
The name derives from the Welsh: "Eagle's mound".

== See also ==
- List of localities in Wales by population
