= Llandyfriog =

Community in Ceredigion, Wales

Llandyfriog: Welsh: Llandyfrïog
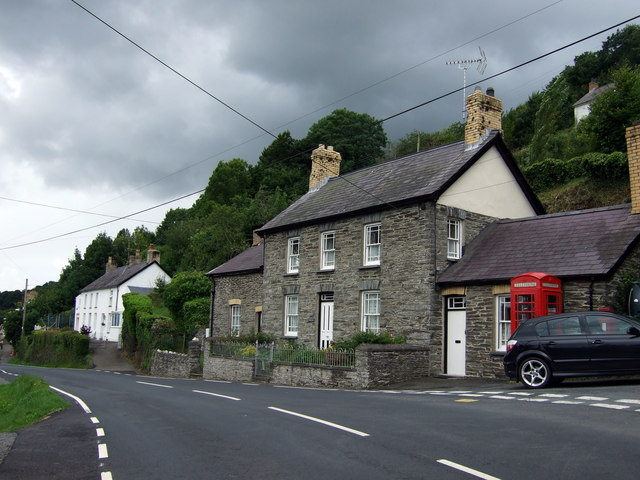

- Location within Ceredigion
- Population: 1,835
- OS grid reference: SN 3312 4134
  - Cardiff: 66.5 mi (107.0 km)
  - London: 187.8 mi (302.2 km)
- Community: Llandyfriog
- Principal area: Ceredigion
- Country: Wales
- Sovereign state: United Kingdom
- Post town: NEWCASTLE EMLYN
- Postcode district: SA38
- Post town: LLANDYSUL
- Postcode district: SA44
- Dialling code: The community includes
- Police: Dyfed-Powys
- Fire: Mid and West Wales
- Ambulance: Welsh
- UK Parliament: Ceredigion Preseli
- Senedd Cymru – Welsh Parliament: Ceredigion Penfro
- List of places UK Wales Ceredigion 52.045305°N 4.434752°W Community map: Map of the community

Llandyfriog is a community in Ceredigion, Wales. It includes the Adpar part of Newcastle Emlyn and the villages, Bangor Teifi, Trebedw, Bryndioddef-isaf, Glyncaled, Berthyfedwen, Pont Ceri and Llanfair Orllwyn. In 2011, the population of the community was 1835 with 54.7% able to speak Welsh.

Gerard H. L. Fitzwilliams M.D., Ch.B., F.R.C.S., (1882–1968), was a British physician who worked in Hong Kong and a spy in Russia at the end of WWI; he was born in the village.

Castell Pistog fortified mound with ditch.

== See also ==
- Llandyfriog transmitting station
