= My People: Stories of the Peasantry of West Wales =

My People is a collection of short stories by Caradoc Evans, first published in 1915 by Andrew Melrose and highly controversial at the time. It is subtitled Stories of the Peasantry of West Wales, and has been described as the first work of modern Anglo-Welsh literature.

The work has been compared with Sherwood Anderson's Winesburg, Ohio, James Joyce's Dubliners (which came out a year earlier although after the text of My People had been completed and submitted to — and rejected by — Stanley Unwin), and The House with the Green Shutters by George Douglas Brown.

In its context of early 20th century Nonconformism, the book was designed to shock, and there was even a move to ban it. Biblical language is used (Evans having learned English largely from this source) in stories where meanness and violence figure prominently. The Western Mail commented that its author "would appear to have raked in the garbage of the countryside for his characters." Many Welsh readers considered it a betrayal of their homeland.
