= Caerwedros =

Village in Ceredigion, Wales

Coordinates: 52°10′37″N 4°22′31″W

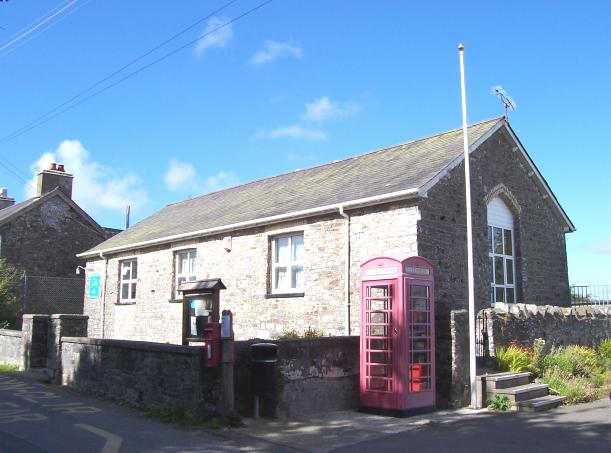
Caerwedros Primary School which was opened in 1852

Caerwedros (pronounced [kaɨrˈwɛdrɔs]) is a small village in western Ceredigion, Wales, in the community of Llandysiliogogo.

Caerwedros village has a Memorial Hall – Neuadd Goffa Caerwedros for community use, including the annual Caerwedros Produce Show held in August each year.

== Location ==
Caerwedros is located three miles from New Quay and Cwmtydu beach.

== History and amenities ==
The site of Caerwedros Castle, is today a mound of earth on the west side of the village. Caerwedros has seen expansion in the last few years by the development of a small number of new houses and bungalows.
