= Blaen-geuffordd =

Village in Ceredigion, Wales

Coordinates: 52.404977°N 3.991641°W

Blaengeuffordd
- Location within Ceredigion
- OS grid reference: SN 6461 8042
  - Cardiff: 72.7 mi (117.0 km)
  - London: 175.8 mi (282.9 km)
- Community: Melindwr
- Principal area: Ceredigion
- Country: Wales
- Sovereign state: United Kingdom
- Post town: Aberystwyth
- Postcode district: SY23
- Police: Dyfed-Powys
- Fire: Mid and West Wales
- Ambulance: Welsh
- UK Parliament: Ceredigion Preseli
- Senedd Cymru – Welsh Parliament: Ceredigion

Blaen-geuffordd is a hamlet in the community of Melindwr, Ceredigion, Wales, 4 miles (6 km) to the east of Aberystwyth. It is 72.7 miles (117.1 km) from Cardiff and 175.8 miles (282.9 km) from London. Blaengeuffordd is represented in the Senedd by Elin Jones (Plaid Cymru) and is part of the Ceredigion Preseli constituency in the House of Commons.

== See also ==
- List of localities in Wales by population
