= Blaen Celyn =

Village in Ceredigion, Wales

Coordinates: 52.164169°N 4.409546°W

Blaencelyn
- Location within Ceredigion
- OS grid reference: SN 3529 5450
  - Cardiff: 70.8 mi (113.9 km)
  - London: 188.3 mi (303.0 km)
- Community: Llangrannog
- Principal area: Ceredigion
- Country: Wales
- Sovereign state: United Kingdom
- Post town: Llandysul
- Postcode district: SA44
- Police: Dyfed-Powys
- Fire: Mid and West Wales
- Ambulance: Welsh
- UK Parliament: Ceredigion Preseli
- Senedd Cymru – Welsh Parliament: Ceredigion Penfro

Blaen Celyn is a hamlet in the community of Llangrannog, Ceredigion, Wales, 2 miles (3.2 km) east of Llangrannog village.

The local St. David's Church is now closed.
