= Bangor Teifi =

Village in Ceredigion, Wales

Coordinates: 52.038625°N 4.360887°W

- Location within Ceredigion
- OS grid reference: SN382404
  - Cardiff: 63.7 mi (102.5 km)
  - London: 184.7 mi (297.2 km)
- Community: Llandyfriog
- Principal area: Ceredigion
- Country: Wales
- Sovereign state: United Kingdom
- Post town: Llandysul
- Postcode district: SA44
- Police: Dyfed-Powys
- Fire: Mid and West Wales
- Ambulance: Welsh
- UK Parliament: Ceredigion Preseli
- Senedd Cymru – Welsh Parliament: Ceredigion

Bangor Teifi is a hamlet in the community of Llandyfriog, Ceredigion, Wales, which is 63.7 miles (102.5 km) from Cardiff and 184.7 miles (297.2 km) from London. Bangor Teifi is represented in the Senedd by Elin Jones (Plaid Cymru) and the Member of Parliament is Ben Lake (Plaid Cymru).

== See also ==
- List of localities in Wales by population
