= Pentre-rhew =

Village in Ceredigion, Wales

Coordinates: 52.175872°N 3.951737°W

- Location within Ceredigion
- OS grid reference: SN 6664 5486
  - Cardiff: 58.3 mi (93.8 km)
  - London: 169.6 mi (272.9 km)
- Community: Llanddewi Brefi
- Principal area: Ceredigion
- Country: Wales
- Sovereign state: United Kingdom
- Post town: Tregaron
- Postcode district: SY25
- Police: Dyfed-Powys
- Fire: Mid and West Wales
- Ambulance: Welsh
- UK Parliament: Ceredigion Preseli
- Senedd Cymru – Welsh Parliament: Ceredigion Penfro

Pentre-rhew is a hamlet in the community of Llanddewi Brefi, Ceredigion, Wales. It is located just south-east of Llanddewi Brefi.

== Etymology ==
The name derives from the Welsh language: "the ice village".

== See also ==
- List of localities in Wales by population
