= Dora's Green =

Hamlet in Hampshire, England

Coordinates: 51.224612°N 0.838348°W

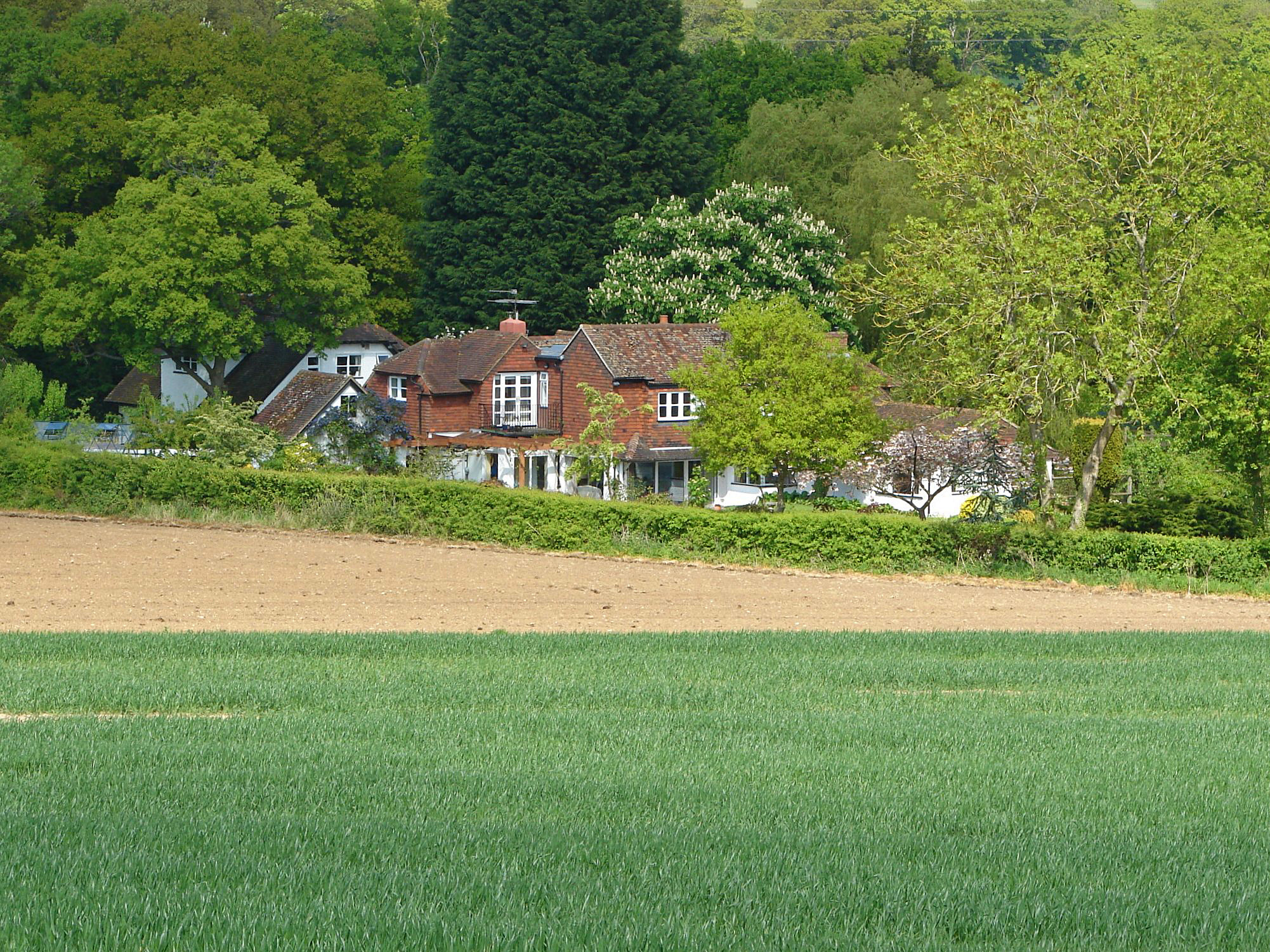
- Cottages in Dora's Green

- Location within Hampshire
- OS grid reference: SU8121647910
- District: Hart
- Shire county: Hampshire
- Region: South East
- Country: England
- Sovereign state: United Kingdom
- Post town: FARNHAM
- Postcode district: GU10
- Police: Hampshire and Isle of Wight
- Fire: Hampshire and Isle of Wight
- Ambulance: South Central
- UK Parliament: North East Hampshire

Dora's Green is a hamlet in the Hart District of Hampshire, England. The hamlet lies near the A287 road between Farnham and Odiham on the Hampshire-Surrey border. Its nearest town is Farnham, approximately 2 miles (3.2 km) south-east.
