= Pont Ceri =

Village in Ceredigion, Wales

Coordinates: 52.049552°N 4.485841°W

- Location within Ceredigion
- OS grid reference: SN 2964 4193
  - Cardiff: 68.4 mi (110.1 km)
  - London: 190 mi (310 km)
- Community: Llandyfriog
- Principal area: Ceredigion
- Country: Wales
- Sovereign state: United Kingdom
- Post town: Newcastle Emlyn
- Postcode district: SA38
- Police: Dyfed-Powys
- Fire: Mid and West Wales
- Ambulance: Welsh
- UK Parliament: Ceredigion Preseli
- Senedd Cymru – Welsh Parliament: Ceredigion

Pont Ceri is a small village in the community of Llandyfriog, Ceredigion, Wales, located where Afon Ceri flows into the River Teifi, two miles (3 km) northwest of Newcastle Emlyn. Pont Ceri is represented in the Senedd by Elin Jones (Plaid Cymru) and the is part of the Ceredigion Preseli constituency in the House of Commons.

== See also ==
- List of localities in Wales by population
