= Hafodiwan =

Village in Ceredigion, Wales

Coordinates: 52.169034°N 4.365134°W

- Location within Ceredigion
- OS grid reference: SN 3835 5494
  - Cardiff: 69.6 mi (112.0 km)
  - London: 186.6 mi (300.3 km)
- Community: Llandysiliogogo
- Principal area: Ceredigion
- Country: Wales
- Sovereign state: United Kingdom
- Post town: Llandysul
- Postcode district: SA44
- Police: Dyfed-Powys
- Fire: Mid and West Wales
- Ambulance: Welsh
- UK Parliament: Ceredigion Preseli
- Senedd Cymru – Welsh Parliament: Ceredigion

Hafodiwan is a hamlet in the community of Llandysiliogogo, Ceredigion, Wales, which is 69.6 miles (112 km) from Cardiff and 186.6 miles (300.2 km) from London. Hafodiwan is represented in the Senedd by Elin Jones (Plaid Cymru) and is part of the Ceredigion Preseli constituency in the House of Commons.

== See also ==
- List of localities in Wales by population
