= Salem, Ceredigion =

Village in Ceredigion, Wales

Coordinates: 52.441°N 3.960°W

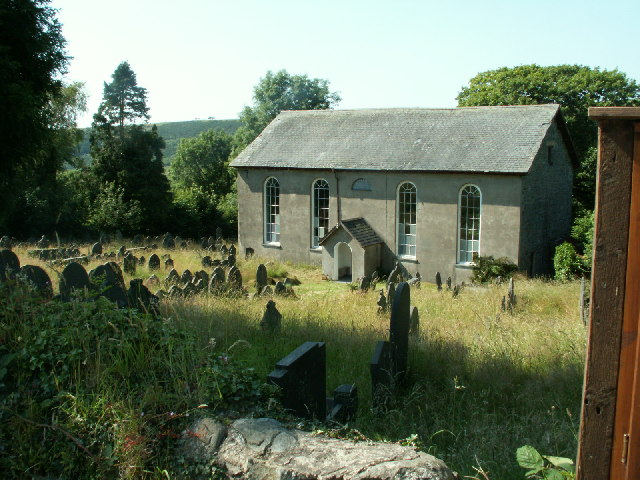
Capel Salem

Salem is a small Welsh village in Ceredigion, located between the Afon Stewi and Nant Seilo rivers. The closest village is Penrhyn-coch.

The Salem Independent Church was built in 1864, in a similar style to the older church at Capel Bangor.

In 1998, a hoard of Roman coins was discovered within the village by metal detector, following a routine pipe excavation by Welsh Water. The 48 coins featured a range of 3rd century emperors, and were displayed in the Ceredigion Museum in Aberystwyth. The hoard is believed to date from the 290s, as a single coin of Carausius (ruled 287–293) was found at the site.
