= Doddycross =

Hamlet in Cornwall, England

Coordinates: 50.4362°N 4.3889°W

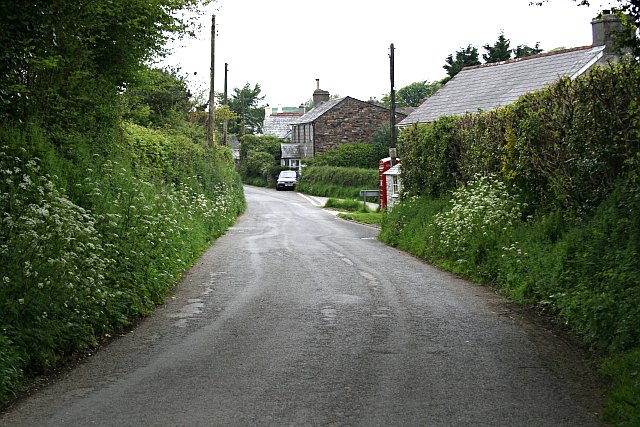

- Location within Cornwall
- Population: 100 estimate
- Civil parish: Menheniot
- Unitary authority: Cornwall
- Ceremonial county: Cornwall
- Region: South West
- Country: England
- Sovereign state: United Kingdom
- Post town: Liskeard
- Postcode district: PL14
- Dialling code: 01503
- Police: Devon and Cornwall
- Fire: Cornwall
- Ambulance: South Western
- UK Parliament: South East Cornwall

Doddycross is a small hamlet at a crossroads in the former Caradon district of southeast Cornwall, England, with a population of <50. There are 14 houses. The hamlet is approximately 16 miles (27 km) west of the city of Plymouth, six miles (10 km) southeast of Liskeard, and 1.5 miles from the village of Menheniot. There is a postbox in the hamlet.
