= Rhydlewis =

Village in Ceredigion, Wales

Coordinates: 52.09°N 4.42°W

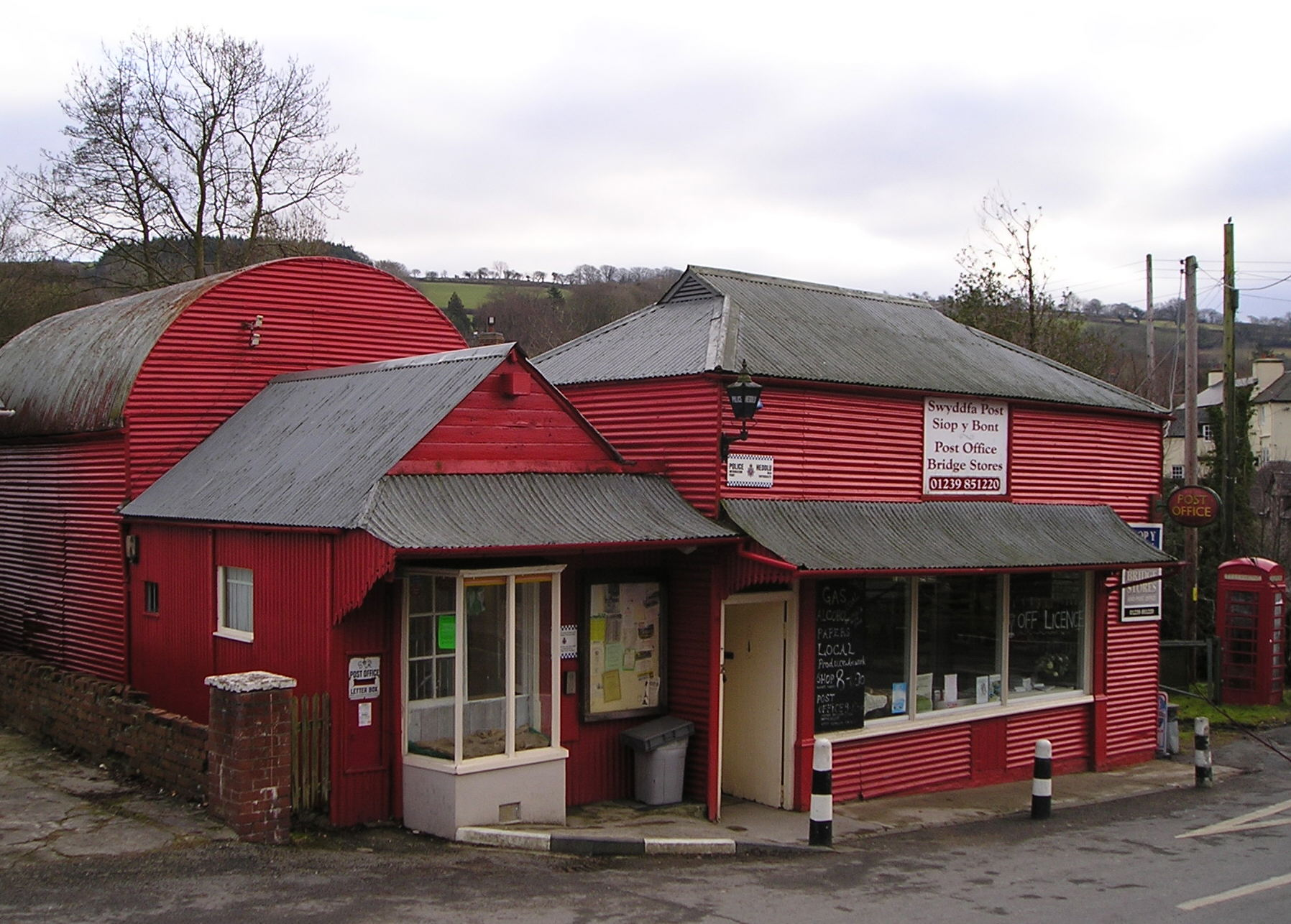
- Rhydlewis Post Office and shop.

- Location within Ceredigion
- OS grid reference: SN340470
- Principal area: Ceredigion
- Preserved county: Dyfed
- Country: Wales
- Sovereign state: United Kingdom
- Post town: Llandysul
- Postcode district: SA44
- Dialling code: 01239
- Police: Dyfed-Powys
- Fire: Mid and West Wales
- Ambulance: Welsh
- UK Parliament: Ceredigion Preseli
- Senedd Cymru – Welsh Parliament: Ceredigion

Rhydlewis is a small village in Ceredigion, Wales. It is situated in an agricultural area with pasture land, woods and low hills.

== History ==
Crafts were an important part of village life. Information recorded in Trade Directories show that in 1890 there were in the village of Rhydlewis two carpenters, one stonemason, one blacksmith, two corn-millers, one baker, five tailors, six boot-makers, three clog-makers, eight weavers, one tanner, one leather currier, two saddlers, one basket-maker and one pin-maker.

== Economy ==
According to the 2011 census there are 285 people living in Rhydlewis, 177 born in Wales, 106 born in England and 2 others. 158 people are Welsh speakers.

Rhydlewis Village Hall was built in 2001 with a National Lottery grant. It replaced the existing corrugated building on the site. The hall is available for private hire and regular activities include a junior/youth club, bowls club, snooker club, art and craft groups, toning sessions, dance exercise and line dancing. Meetings of the Rhydlewis and District Gardening Club also take place at the hall most months.

The children's novelist Elizabeth Mary Jones (1878–1953) known as 'Moelona', lived here and taught at Rhydlewis Primary School.

"Hen Siop y Bont" is the village shop and post office. It is housed in a Grade II listed wooden building clad in corrugated metal sheeting that dates back to the nineteenth century. Ddol Garage and Mark Webb butchers are also based in the village.

The village is the home of Hawen Welsh Independent Chapel which was built (originally) in 1747 and is still functioning. This was the inspiration for "Capel Sion" in the book of the same name by the eminent Welsh writer Caradoc Evans.

Also in the village is Twr-Gwyn Methodist Chapel (Capel Twrgwyn). It is believed that chapel meetings originally took place in a small barn at nearby Twrgwyn Farm until the first chapel was built in 1750. It was enlarged in 1779, rebuilt in 1816 and 1846, and then renewed in 1932. The present chapel, dated 1846, is built in the Simple Round-Headed style of the long-wall entry type. Capel Tŵr Gwyn was the venue for a Cymanfa Ganu broadcast on BBC Radio Cymru on 25 September 2011.

"Lewis Rhydlewis" is a coach company based at Penrhiwpal just outside the village. It was founded in 1955 and operates about twenty vehicles; these are used for school contracts and private hire, day trips and holiday tours.

== Notable people ==
- Thomas Cynfelyn Benjamin (1850–1925), Welsh language poet and congregational minister, lived at Brynaraul, Rhydlewis, between 1905 and 1911
