= Dollwen =

Village in Ceredigion, Wales

Coordinates: 52.41336°N 3.930842°W

- Location within Ceredigion
- OS grid reference: SN 6877 8124
  - Cardiff: 72.1 mi (116.0 km)
  - London: 173.6 mi (279.4 km)
- Community: Melindwr
- Principal area: Ceredigion
- Country: Wales
- Sovereign state: United Kingdom
- Post town: Aberystwyth
- Postcode district: SY23
- Police: Dyfed-Powys
- Fire: Mid and West Wales
- Ambulance: Welsh
- UK Parliament: Ceredigion Preseli
- Senedd Cymru – Welsh Parliament: Ceredigion

Dollwen is a hamlet in the community of Melindwr, Ceredigion, Wales, which is 72.1 miles (116 km) from Cardiff and 173.6 miles (279.4 km) from London. Dollwen is represented in the Senedd by Elin Jones (Plaid Cymru) and is part of the Ceredigion Preseli constituency in the House of Commons.

== See also ==
- List of localities in Wales by population
