= Pen-bont-rhyd-y-beddau =

Village in Ceredigion, Wales

Coordinates: 52.434528°N 3.949482°W

- Location within Ceredigion
- OS grid reference: SN 6791 8364
  - Cardiff: 73.7 mi (118.6 km)
  - London: 174.8 mi (281.3 km)
- Community: Trefeurig
- Principal area: Ceredigion
- Country: Wales
- Sovereign state: United Kingdom
- Post town: Aberystwyth
- Postcode district: SY23
- Police: Dyfed-Powys
- Fire: Mid and West Wales
- Ambulance: Welsh
- UK Parliament: Ceredigion Preseli
- Senedd Cymru – Welsh Parliament: Ceredigion

Pen-bont-rhyd-y-beddau (also spelled as Pen-bont Rhydybeddau or Pen-Bont-Rhyd-y-Beddau) is a small village in the community of Trefeurig, Ceredigion, Wales, which is 73.7 miles (118.6 km) from Cardiff and 174.8 miles (281.3 km) from London. Pen-bont-rhyd-y-beddau is represented in the Senedd by Elin Jones and the Member of Parliament is Ben Lake both representing Plaid Cymru.

The name of the village likely means "end of the bridge at the ford of graves" The name refers to the bridge built near an old crossing where tragic drownings and historic burials took place.

== See also ==
- List of localities in Wales by population
