= Cwmbrwyno =

Village in Ceredigion, Wales

Coordinates: 52.409253°N 3.901253°W

- Location within Ceredigion
- OS grid reference: SN 7077 8073
  - Cardiff: 71.2 mi (114.6 km)
  - London: 172.3 mi (277.3 km)
- Community: Melindwr
- Principal area: Ceredigion
- Country: Wales
- Sovereign state: United Kingdom
- Post town: Aberystwyth
- Postcode district: SY23
- Police: Dyfed-Powys
- Fire: Mid and West Wales
- Ambulance: Welsh
- UK Parliament: Ceredigion Preseli
- Senedd Cymru – Welsh Parliament: Ceredigion

Cwmbrwyno is a hamlet in the community of Melindwr, Ceredigion, Wales, which is 71.2 miles (114.7 km) from Cardiff and 172.3 miles (277.3 km) from London. Cwmbrwyno is represented in the Senedd by Elin Jones (Plaid Cymru) and is part of the Ceredigion Preseli constituency in the House of Commons.

There are former lead mines nearby.

== See also ==
- Mwyngloddfa Cwmbrwyno - a Site of Special Scientific Interest nearby
- List of localities in Wales by population
