= Daren =

Village in Ceredigion, Wales

Coordinates: 52.426979°N 3.944824°W

Banc-y-Darren
- Location within Ceredigion
- OS grid reference: SN 6786 8278
  - Cardiff: 73.2 mi (117.8 km)
  - London: 174.5 mi (280.8 km)
- Community: Trefeurig
- Principal area: Ceredigion
- Country: Wales
- Sovereign state: United Kingdom
- Post town: Aberystwyth
- Postcode district: SY23
- Police: Dyfed-Powys
- Fire: Mid and West Wales
- Ambulance: Welsh
- UK Parliament: Ceredigion Preseli
- Senedd Cymru – Welsh Parliament: Ceredigion

Daren is a hamlet in the community of Trefeurig, Ceredigion, Wales, which is 73.2 miles (117.7 km) from Cardiff and 174.5 miles (280.8 km) from London. It is represented in the Senedd by Elin Jones (Plaid Cymru) and is part of the Ceredigion Preseli constituency in the House of Commons.

== Daren Bank ==
Daren is a small hamlet of about eight houses surrounded by agricultural land, in the community of Trefeurig.

Nearby lies Daren Camp, an Iron Age hillfort featuring a strong single rampart enclosing an oval area approximately 0.44 hectares in size, with archaeological evidence of earlier Bronze Age cairns and historical mining activity linked to the nearby silver-lead Daren Lode.

== See also ==
- List of localities in Wales by population
