= Llandyfriog transmitting station =

Llandyfriog
- Location within Ceredigion
- Mast height: 25 metres (82 ft)
- Coordinates: 52.044975°N 4.40959°W
- Grid reference: SN348412
- Built: 1980
- Relay of: Preseli
- BBC region: BBC Wales
- ITV region: ITV Cymru Wales

The Llandyfriog transmitting station is a broadcasting and telecommunications facility located on high ground several kilometres east of the town of Newcastle Emlyn, Ceredigion, South Wales. It was built in 1980 to relay VHF radio and UHF television to Newcastle Emlyn and the area in general. The site has a 25 m self-standing lattice mast erected on land that is itself about 105 m above sea level and acts as an off-air television relay of Preseli, about 20 km to the west.

Since Winter 1981 Llandyfriog has transmitted FM radio, acting as an off-air relay of Blaenplwyf about 50 km to the north. In Spring 1983 the radio services were upgraded to stereo.

Currently, Llandyfriog transmitter provides DVB-T digital television to the area, along with FM radio.

== Services listed by frequency ==
=== Analogue television ===
==== 4 November 1977 - 1 November 1982 ====
The station launched with just the original three channels.

Frequency	UHF	kW	Service
479.25 MHz	22	0.11	BBC One Wales
503.25 MHz	25	0.11	HTV Wales
527.25 MHz	28	0.11	BBC Two Wales

==== 1 November 1982 - November 1997 ====
Being in Wales, when Channel 4 arrived in 1982, Llandyfriog transmitted the S4C variant.

Frequency	UHF	kW	Service
479.25 MHz	22	0.11	BBC One Wales
503.25 MHz	25	0.11	HTV Wales
527.25 MHz	28	0.11	BBC Two Wales
559.25 MHz	32	0.11	S4C

==== November 1997 - 19 August 2009 ====
Llandyfriog was the site of one of the UK's two self-help analogue Channel 5 transmitters.

Frequency	UHF	kW	Service
479.25 MHz	22	0.11	BBC One Wales
503.25 MHz	25	0.11	ITV1 Wales (HTV Wales until 2002)
527.25 MHz	28	0.11	BBC Two Wales
559.25 MHz	32	0.11	S4C
583.25 MHz	35	0.11	C5

=== Analogue and digital television ===
==== 19 August 2009 - 16 September 2009 ====
The UK's digital switchover commenced, mirroring the changes taking place at the parent transmitter at Preseli. Analogue BBC Two Wales closed on channel 28 and ITV1 Wales took over on that frequency for what would be its final 3 weeks of service, vacating channel 25 as it did so. The new digital BBC A multiplex started up at full power in 64-QAM mode on channel 25.

Frequency	UHF	kW	Service	System
479.25 MHz	22	0.11	BBC One Wales	PAL System I
506.000 MHz	25	0.022	BBC A	DVB-T
527.25 MHz	28	0.11	ITV1 Wales	PAL System I
559.25 MHz	32	0.11	S4C	PAL System I
583.25 MHz	35	0.11	C5	PAL System I

=== Digital television ===
==== 23 September 2009 - present ====
All the analogue television services closed and the new digital multiplexes took over on channels 22 and 28.

Frequency	UHF	kW	Operator
482.000 MHz	22	0.022	Digital 3&4
506.000 MHz	25	0.022	BBC A
530.000 MHz	28	0.022	BBC B

=== Analogue radio (FM VHF) ===
==== Winter 1981 - present ====
Frequency	kW	Service
90.1 MHz	0.05	BBC Radio 2
92.3 MHz	0.05	BBC Radio 3
94.5 MHz	0.05	BBC Radio Cymru
99.7 MHz	0.05	BBC Radio 1
104.4 MHz	0.05	BBC Radio 4

== See also ==
- List of masts
- List of radio stations in the United Kingdom
- List of tallest buildings and structures in Great Britain
