= Penbontrhydyfothau =

Village in Ceredigion, Wales

Coordinates: 52.165934°N 4.399757°W

- Location within Ceredigion
- OS grid reference: SN 3597 5468
  - Cardiff: 70.5 mi (113.5 km)
  - London: 187.9 mi (302.4 km)
- Community: Llandysiliogogo
- Principal area: Ceredigion
- Country: Wales
- Sovereign state: United Kingdom
- Post town: Llandysul
- Postcode district: SA44
- Police: Dyfed-Powys
- Fire: Mid and West Wales
- Ambulance: Welsh
- UK Parliament: Ceredigion Preseli
- Senedd Cymru – Welsh Parliament: Ceredigion

Penbontrhydyfothau is a hamlet in the community of Llandysiliogogo, Ceredigion, Wales, which is 70.5 miles (113.4 km) from Cardiff and 187.9 miles (302.4 km) from London. Penbontrhydyfothau is represented in the Senedd by Elin Jones (Plaid Cymru) and the Member of Parliament is Ben Lake (Plaid Cymru).

== See also ==
- List of localities in Wales by population
