= Brongest =

Village in Ceredigion, Wales

Coordinates: 52.079909°N 4.449247°W

- Brongest in 2008

- Location within Ceredigion
- OS grid reference: SN 3226 4522
  - Cardiff: 68.4 mi (110.1 km)
  - London: 188.9 mi (304.0 km)
- Community: Troedyraur
- Principal area: Ceredigion
- Country: Wales
- Sovereign state: United Kingdom
- Post town: Newcastle Emlyn
- Postcode district: SA38
- Police: Dyfed-Powys
- Fire: Mid and West Wales
- Ambulance: Welsh
- UK Parliament: Ceredigion Preseli
- Senedd Cymru – Welsh Parliament: Ceredigion

Brongest is a small village in the community of Troedyraur, Ceredigion, Wales, which is 68.4 miles (110.1 km) from Cardiff and 188.9 miles (303.9 km) from London. Brongest is represented in the Senedd by Elin Jones (Plaid Cymru) and is part of the Ceredigion Preseli constituency in the House of Commons.

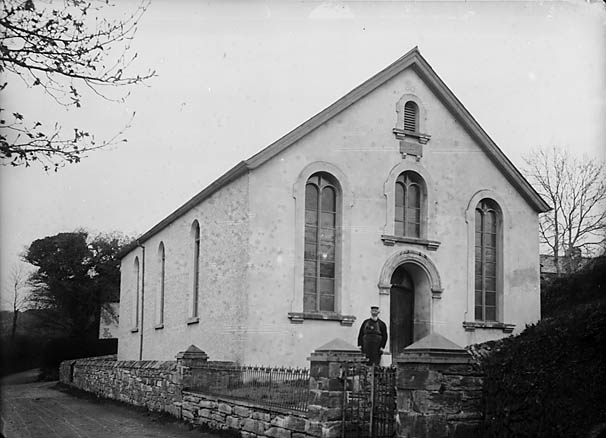
Salem chapel (CM) Brongest, Troed-yr-aur

== See also ==
- List of localities in Wales by population
