= Caradoc Evans =

Welsh writer

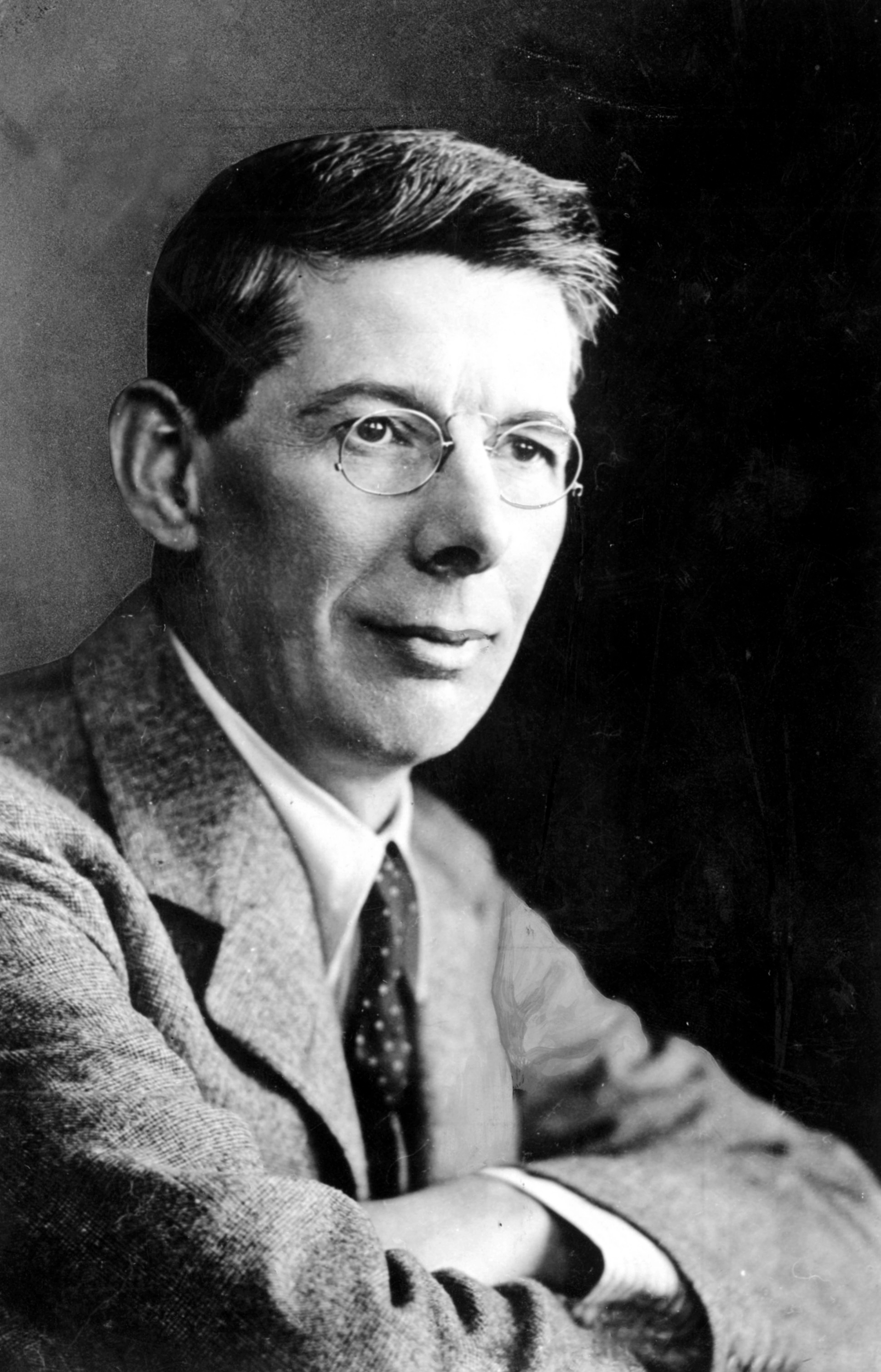
Caradoc Evans

David Caradoc Evans (31 December 1878 – 11 January 1945), was a Welsh story writer, novelist and playwright.

== Biography ==
Evans was brought up in a Welsh-speaking community in Rhydlewis, Cardiganshire, and although he learned English at school and always wrote in English his work is influenced by Welsh syntax and vocabulary in a similar way to the way Lewis Grassic Gibbon's work in Scotland (written in roughly the same period) was influenced by Scots. Evans left school at 14 and worked throughout Wales in a series of menial jobs before moving to London where he worked as a draper's apprentice. He attended classes St Pancras Working Men's College and then became a journalist. He worked for The Daily Mirror from 1917 before editing T.P.'s Weekly from 1923 until the weekly folded in 1929.

Lanlas Uchaf, Rhydlewis where Evans lived as a child.

His first (and possibly most important) work of fiction was a series of short stories called My People, published by Andrew Melrose in 1915. It may be compared with Sherwood Anderson's Winesburg, Ohio and James Joyce's Dubliners. In tone, however, this work is closer to The House with the Green Shutters by George Douglas Brown.

Evans wished to shock the Welsh out of their complacency and smugness by contrasting the pieties of non-conformist Christianity with the brutal realities of poverty, meanness and hypocrisy he had personally experienced.

The work was savagely attacked by Welsh critics – he was known for a while in the Welsh press as "the best hated man in Wales"—but can now be seen as perhaps the first genuinely modern work of Anglo-Welsh literature. Evans wrote numerous other novels, plays and short story collections, but none attained the success of My People. His next collection, Capel Sion, was withdrawn from Welsh bookshops, because of the hostility he had aroused as much as for the subject matter.

Dylan Thomas's early and more surreal writing is said to be influenced by Caradoc's My People. Both Caradoc Evans, and Dylan Thomas's namesake and great uncle Gwilym Marles (William Thomas) were born in Llandysul.

Caradoc met (1929) and later married (1933) the Countess Helene Marguerite Barcynska, who wrote romantic novels under the name Oliver Sandys. His first wife, Rose Jesse (nee Sewell), whom he had married on Christmas Day 1907, petitioned for divorce in 1932. Living together in Aberystwyth and at Ruislip, Middlesex from 1937 to 1939, Marguerite and Caradoc were involved in theatrical ventures, both in Wales and in England.

After the outbreak of the Second World War in 1939, they returned to Aberystwyth, and eventually settled in 1940 in New Cross, Cardiganshire, about five miles from Aberystwyth, where Caradoc remained with his son until his own death in 1945. In the 1940s, Marguerite wrote two autobiographical works, published by the publisher Hurst and Blackett. The first, Full and Frank: the Private Life of the Woman Novelist (1941), is a presentation of the author's life to the public. The second is a biography of Caradoc. The house they lived in, "Brynawelon" had spectacular views of Plynlimon, which may have inspired her book The Miracle Stone of Wales (1957). Caradoc Evans died of heart failure at the Aberystwyth and Cardiganshire General Hospital, Aberystwyth in January 1945 aged 66 and is buried in the New Cross Horeb chapel cemetery.

== List of works ==
- My People (1915)
- Capel Sion (1916)
- My Neighbours (1919)
- Taffy (1923)
- Nothing to Pay (1930)
- Wasps (1933)
- This way to heaven (1934)
- Kitty Shore's Magic Cake (1934)
- Pilgrims in a Foreign Land (1942)
- Morgan Bible (1943)
- The Earth Gives All and Takes All (1946)
