= Pant-y-crug =

Village in Ceredigion, Wales

Coordinates: 52.388208°N 3.981218°W

- Location within Ceredigion
- OS grid reference: SN 6527 7853
  - Cardiff: 71.5 mi (115.1 km)
  - London: 175 mi (282 km)
- Community: Melindwr
- Principal area: Ceredigion
- Country: Wales
- Sovereign state: United Kingdom
- Post town: Aberystwyth
- Postcode district: SY23
- Police: Dyfed-Powys
- Fire: Mid and West Wales
- Ambulance: Welsh
- UK Parliament: Ceredigion Preseli
- Senedd Cymru – Welsh Parliament: Ceredigion

Pant-y-crug is a hamlet in the community of Melindwr, Ceredigion, Wales, which is 71.5 miles (115 km) from Cardiff and 175 miles (281.6 km) from London. Pant-y-crug is represented in the Senedd by Elin Jones (Plaid Cymru) and is part of the Ceredigion Preseli constituency in the House of Commons.

== Etymology ==
The name derives from the Welsh language meaning "the valley of the cairn".

== See also ==
- List of localities in Wales by population
