= Waunifor =

Estate in Ceredigion, Wales

Coordinates: 52.046461°N 4.247294°W

- Location within Ceredigion
- OS grid reference: SN 4598 4106
  - Cardiff: 60.2 mi (96.9 km)
  - London: 179.9 mi (289.5 km)
- Community: Llandysul
- Principal area: Ceredigion
- Country: Wales
- Sovereign state: United Kingdom
- Post town: Pencader
- Postcode district: SA39
- Police: Dyfed-Powys
- Fire: Mid and West Wales
- Ambulance: Welsh
- UK Parliament: Ceredigion Preseli
- Senedd Cymru – Welsh Parliament: Ceredigion Penfro

Waunifor or Waun Ifor (Welsh for 'Ifor's Meadow') is a historic estate, once the seat of the Lloyd and Bowen families, located in the small village community of Maesycrugiau near Llandysul, Ceredigion, Wales, which is 60.2 miles (96.9 km) from Cardiff and 179.9 miles (289.5 km) from London.

Waunifor is now a Centre with 6 holiday cottages and 2 meeting rooms owned by the Template Foundation charity. It is used for workshops, art exhibitions, wellbeing seminars, youth gatherings, bereavement counselling and music events.

Waunifor is represented in the Senedd by Elin Jones (Plaid Cymru) and is part of the Ceredigion Preseli constituency in the House of Commons.

== See also ==
- List of localities in Wales by population
