= Ffynnon-oer =

Village in Ceredigion, Wales

Coordinates: 52.159068°N 4.149073°W

- Location within Ceredigion
- OS grid reference: SN 5309 5338
  - Cardiff: 62.6 mi (100.7 km)
  - London: 177.4 mi (285.5 km)
- Community: Llanfihangel Ystrad
- Principal area: Ceredigion
- Country: Wales
- Sovereign state: United Kingdom
- Post town: Aberaeron
- Postcode district: SA48
- Police: Dyfed-Powys
- Fire: Mid and West Wales
- Ambulance: Welsh
- UK Parliament: Ceredigion Preseli
- Senedd Cymru – Welsh Parliament: Ceredigion Penfro

Ffynnon-oer is a hamlet in the community of Llanfihangel Ystrad, Ceredigion, Wales, which is 62.6 miles (100.8 km) from Cardiff and 177.4 miles (285.6 km) from London. Ffynnon-oer is represented in the Senedd by Elin Jones (Plaid Cymru) and the Member of Parliament is Ben Lake (Plaid Cymru).

== Etymology ==
The name derives from the Welsh language: "Cold well".

== See also ==
- List of localities in Wales by population
