= Cefn-y-Llwyd =

Village in Ceredigion, Wales

Coordinates: 52.428544°N 3.983744°W

Cefn Llwyd
- Location within Ceredigion
- OS grid reference: SN 6522 8302
  - Cardiff: 74 mi (119 km)
  - London: 176 mi (283 km)
- Community: Trefeurig
- Principal area: Ceredigion
- Country: Wales
- Sovereign state: United Kingdom
- Post town: Aberystwyth
- Postcode district: SY23
- Police: Dyfed-Powys
- Fire: Mid and West Wales
- Ambulance: Welsh
- UK Parliament: Ceredigion Preseli
- Senedd Cymru – Welsh Parliament: Ceredigion

Cefn-y-Llwyd is a hamlet in the community of Trefeurig, Ceredigion, Wales, which is 74 miles (119 km) from Cardiff. Cefn Llwyd is represented in the Senedd by Elin Jones (Plaid Cymru) and is part of the Ceredigion Preseli constituency in the House of Commons.

== See also ==
- List of localities in Wales by population
