= Pentre-bach, Ceredigion =

Village in Ceredigion, Wales

Coordinates: 52.103965°N 4.111972°W

Pentre-bach
- Location within Ceredigion
- OS grid reference: SN 5545 4717
  - Cardiff: 58.8 mi (94.6 km)
  - London: 175.1 mi (281.8 km)
- Community: Lampeter
- Principal area: Ceredigion
- Country: Wales
- Sovereign state: United Kingdom
- Post town: Aberaeron
- Postcode district: SA48
- Police: Dyfed-Powys
- Fire: Mid and West Wales
- Ambulance: Welsh
- UK Parliament: Ceredigion Preseli
- Senedd Cymru – Welsh Parliament: Ceredigion Penfro

Pentre-bach is a small village in the community of Lampeter, Ceredigion, Wales. Pentre-bach is represented in the Senedd by Elin Jones (Plaid Cymru) and is part of the Ceredigion Preseli constituency in the House of Commons.
