= Penrhyn-coch =

Village in Ceredigion, Wales

Coordinates: 52.439°N 3.995°W

- Location within Ceredigion
- Population: 1,583 (2009)
- OS grid reference: SN645842
- Principal area: Ceredigion
- Preserved county: Dyfed
- Country: Wales
- Sovereign state: United Kingdom
- Post town: Aberystwyth
- Postcode district: SY23
- Dialling code: 01970
- Police: Dyfed-Powys
- Fire: Mid and West Wales
- Ambulance: Welsh
- UK Parliament: Ceredigion Preseli
- Senedd Cymru – Welsh Parliament: Ceredigion Penfro

Penrhyn-coch is a small village in the community of Trefeurig, Ceredigion, Wales, located between Afon Stewi and Nant Seilo rivers, close to where they merge into Afon Clarach. The village is approximately 4 1/2 miles (7.2 km) north-east of Aberystwyth.

The village has expanded since the 1970s with several housing estates being built. There are around 480 houses and an estimated population of 1,037 (2005). Most of the working population is employed in Aberystwyth or at the nearby Aberystwyth University, Institute of Biological and Environmental Research.

== Facilities ==
Penrhyn-coch has a range of facilities including a school, post office, petrol station, social club, tennis courts, children's playground, two places of worship St. John's parish church and Horeb Nonconformist chapel, three halls and a nursery. Just outside the village is a Natural Resources Wales (formerly Forestry Commission) site named Gogerddan Allt Ddel, with hillwalking and picnic facilities. Penrhyncoch F.C. of the Cymru North league play at Cae Baker in the centre of the village.

== History ==
The village of Penrhyn-coch is a recent development; in the 18th century there was no village, the land formed part of the Gogerddan Estate owned by the Pryse family. The village started to develop at the end of the 18th century, but major growth did not occur until after the break-up of the Gogerddan Estate in the 1940s.

A memorial to the fallen of both World Wars who came from the village and surrounding area can be found outside the post office. The large block of quartz used for the memorial, according to a thesis published in 1939, is an ancient standing stone.

=== Notable residents ===
Penrhyn-coch was the birthplace of the great 14th-century poet Dafydd ap Gwilym and home for a period in the 1750s to hydrographer and scholar Lewis Morris. Revered national librarian David Jenkins lived there since childhood. It is the chosen home of novelist Niall Griffiths.
