= Penrhiwpal =

Village in Ceredigion, Wales

Coordinates: 52.086416°N 4.413443°W

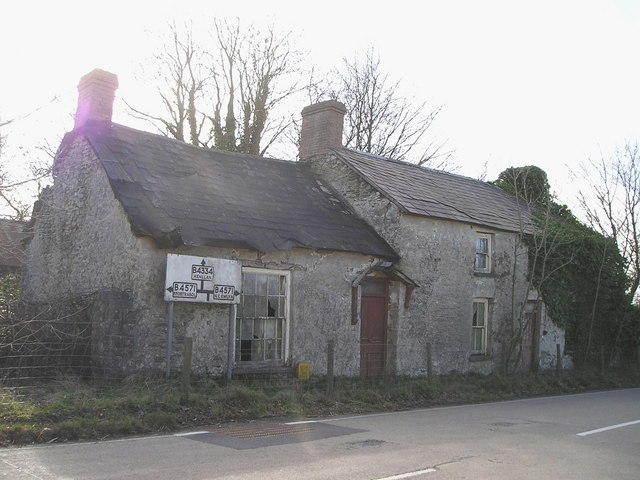
- A derelict house in Penrhiwpal

- Location within Ceredigion
- OS grid reference: SN 3474 4587
  - Cardiff: 67.4 mi (108.5 km)
  - London: 187.4 mi (301.6 km)
- Community: Troedyraur
- Principal area: Ceredigion
- Country: Wales
- Sovereign state: United Kingdom
- Post town: Llandysul
- Postcode district: SA44
- Police: Dyfed-Powys
- Fire: Mid and West Wales
- Ambulance: Welsh
- UK Parliament: Ceredigion Preseli
- Senedd Cymru – Welsh Parliament: Ceredigion

Penrhiwpal (Welsh: Penrhywpâl) is a small village in the community of Troedyraur, Ceredigion, Wales. Penrhiwpal is represented in the Senedd by Elin Jones (Plaid Cymru) and is part of the Ceredigion Preseli constituency in the House of Commons.
