= Bwlchyfadfa =

Village in Ceredigion, Wales

Coordinates: 52.121162°N 4.284453°W

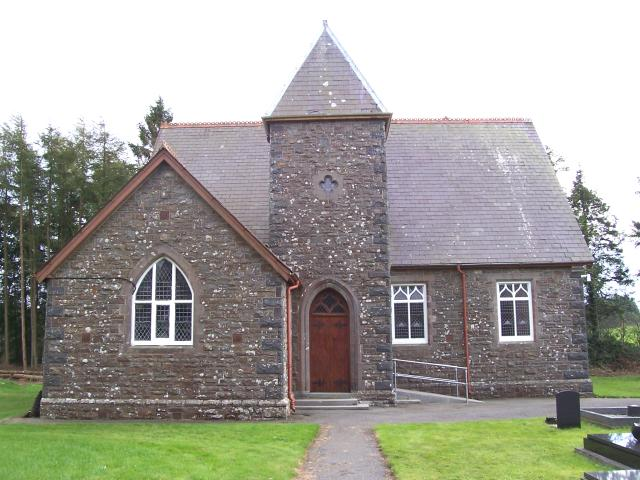
- Bwlchyfadfa Chapel

- Location within Ceredigion
- OS grid reference: SN 4370 4944
  - Cardiff: 64.9 mi (104.4 km)
  - London: 182.5 mi (293.7 km)
- Community: Llandysul
- Principal area: Ceredigion
- Country: Wales
- Sovereign state: United Kingdom
- Post town: Llandysul
- Postcode district: SA44
- Police: Dyfed-Powys
- Fire: Mid and West Wales
- Ambulance: Welsh
- UK Parliament: Ceredigion Preseli
- Senedd Cymru – Welsh Parliament: Ceredigion Penfro

Bwlchyfadfa is a hamlet in the community of Llandysul, Ceredigion, Wales, which is 64.9 miles (104.4 km) from Cardiff and 182.5 miles (293.8 km) from London. Bwlchyfadfa is represented in the Senedd by Elin Jones (Plaid Cymru) and is part of the Ceredigion Preseli constituency in the House of Commons.

== See also ==
- List of localities in Wales by population
