= Cwmsymlog =

Protected area in Ceredigion, Wales

Coordinates: 52°26′15″N 3°54′54″W

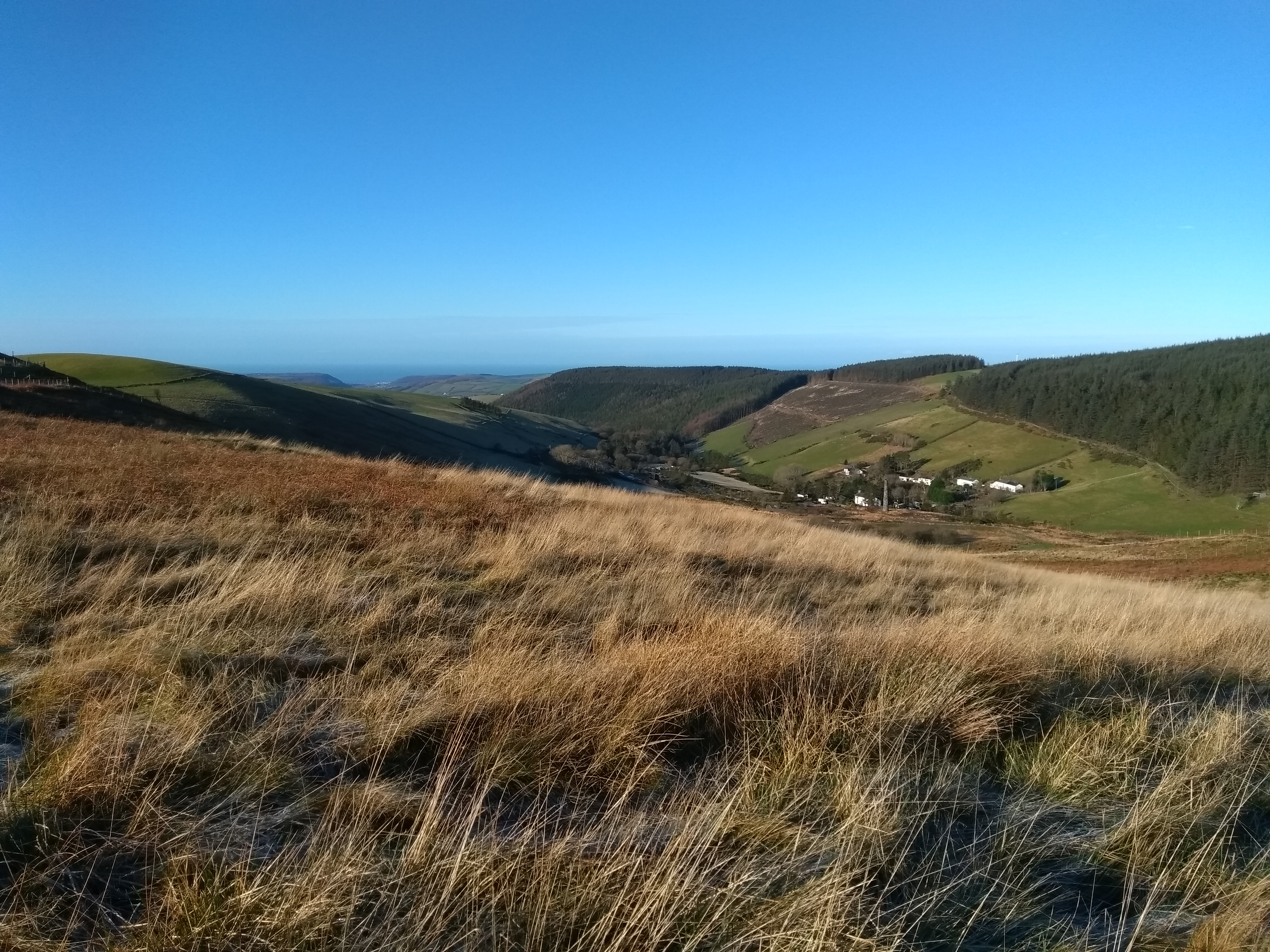
Cwmsymlog Valley and Village

Cwmsymlog is a short valley, sheltering a hamlet of the same name, in Ceredigion, in the west of Wales. Once an important mining area, but the mining slowly declined and finally came to an end in 1901. Now it is peaceful, open countryside with a few mining remains, scattered houses and farmland. It is also the name of a Site of Special Scientific Interest at that location.

== Present ==
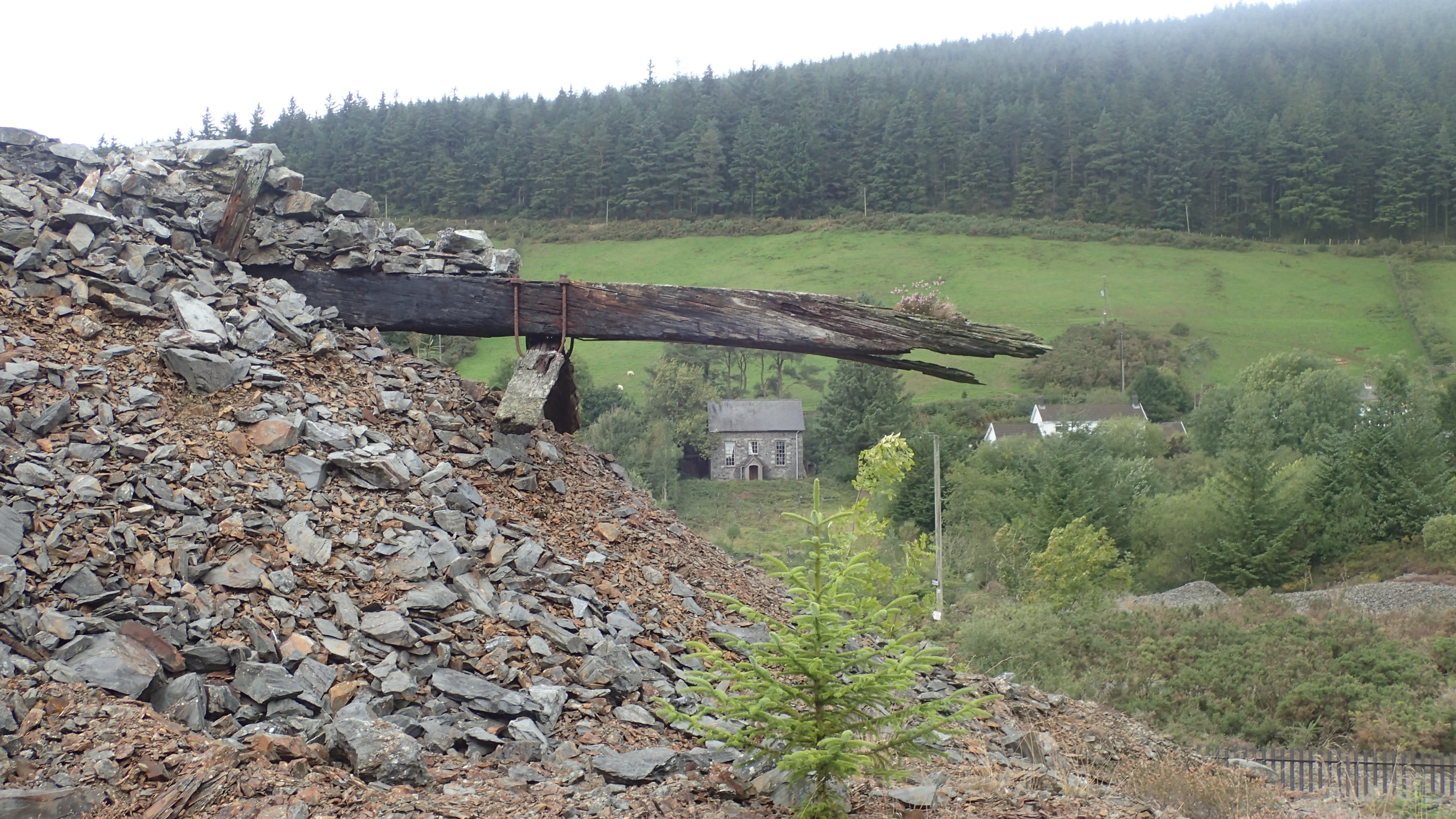
Remains of the mine workings with the chapel in the background

Nowadays Cwmsymlog lies hidden amongst the trees, surrounded by fields of sheep. The small settlement itself has a chapel (now disused and in private ownership) and a few scattered houses. One of these has a standing stone in front of the house. Another, called Plas Wigwam, was the grand home of the mine captain, his family and staff. There are the derelict remains of several houses around the village from when it was a thriving mining community. 2024 saw the building of the first new house in the village for over 100 years when a barn was demolished and a modern house built on the site.

The mine chimney dominates the landscape but everywhere around are traces of mining. There are many ruined industrial buildings and mine shafts, and the stream has been engineered into adits and leats. Spoil piles from the mine works are slowly being reclaimed by nature with gorse bushes and rare ferns. The mine chimney, nineteenth century, was restored in 2006 with extensive repairs to the top. Smaller stones were used for the top section to show the difference between the old construction and the restored part.

The Borth to Devil's Bridge to Pontrhydfendigaid Trail runs through the valley and the mountain bike trails of Bwlch Nant yr Arian skirt around the edge. The valley is also popular with off road drivers and motorcyclists.

== Stone Age ==
The presence of Palaeolithic and Mesolithic hunters is unlikely, but that of Neolithic farmers cannot entirely be ruled out.

== Bronze Age ==
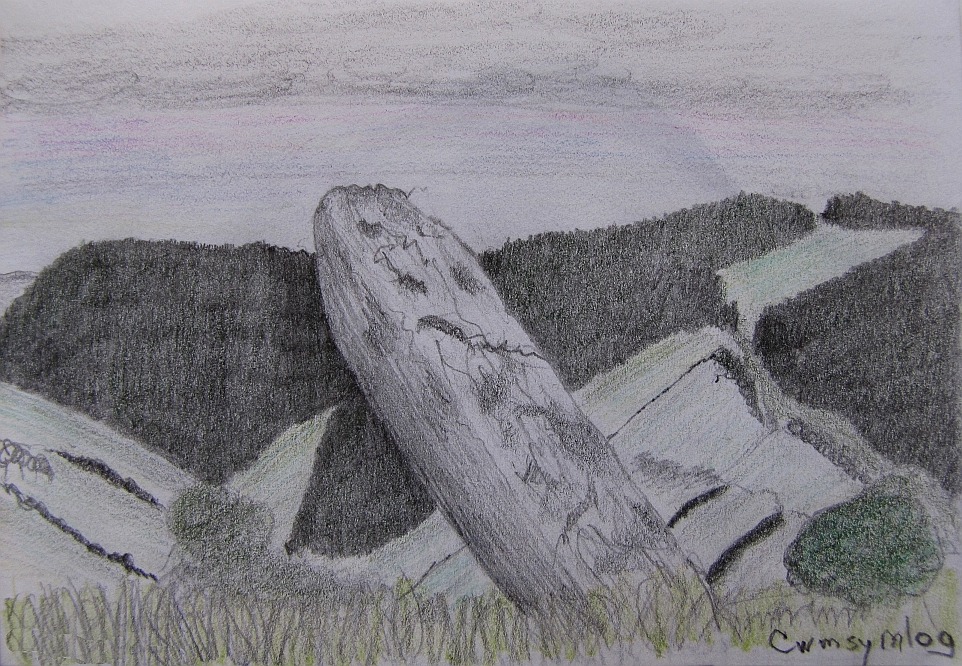
Pant y Garreg Hir, by Anneke Ritman

In the Bronze Age several standing stones were erected. Dating of these holy places: c.2300-800 BC. Two stones are near Pen-bont Rhydybeddau (Head of the bridge Ford of the graves), one is near the hill-fort Pen y Castell, one in front of a house called Pant y Garreg Hir (Hollow of the Long Stone) and two lie close together with the name Buwch a'r Llo (Cow and Calf) east of the last one. Near-by these paired monoliths is another one. Also built in the Bronze Age are two burial mounds (cairns/piles of stones): Garn-Wen (White Cairn) lies near Pent-bont Rhydybeddau and Carn Dolgau (Cairn of Meadow of hollow) is near Cwmerfyn (cwm/valley).

The standing stone called Garreg Hir was tumbling and eventually fell in 2017. The Dutch archaeologist Lex Ritman contacted CADW in 2018 and with the cooperation and initiative of Louise Mees, regional inspector of ancient monuments and archaeology, the project started to re-erect this ancient monument. The reinstatement concerns a scheduled monument. It is legally protected. The reference name is Standing Stone c.500 m SW of Llyn Pendam, reference number CD 230. It is on the list of scheduled monuments at risk.

== Iron Age ==
In the Iron Age several hill-forts were constructed with ramparts and ditches. Banc-y-Darren (banc/hillside) lies south of Pent-bont Rhydybeddau and Pen y Castell (Head of the Castle) north of it. These defended villages are about 2000 years old.

== Middle Ages and later ==
In medieval times and perhaps earlier Cwmsymlog (East Darren) became a mining district. In the sixteenth and seventeenth century the region was mainly known for silver mining. Smelting was at Furnace (near Talybont) and in Aberystwyth Mint was the locally minted silver. Nantyrarian (Brook of silver) is of course a logical name. Later on lead mining became important. Especially in the eighteenth and nineteenth centuries. Traces of these activities are everywhere: shafts like Skinner's Shaft, Taylor's Shaft and Pryse's Shaft, a tramway, leats, wheel pits, spoil tips, the reservoir Llyn Pendam (Lake of the Head of the dam) and a recently restored mine chimney.

== Chapels ==
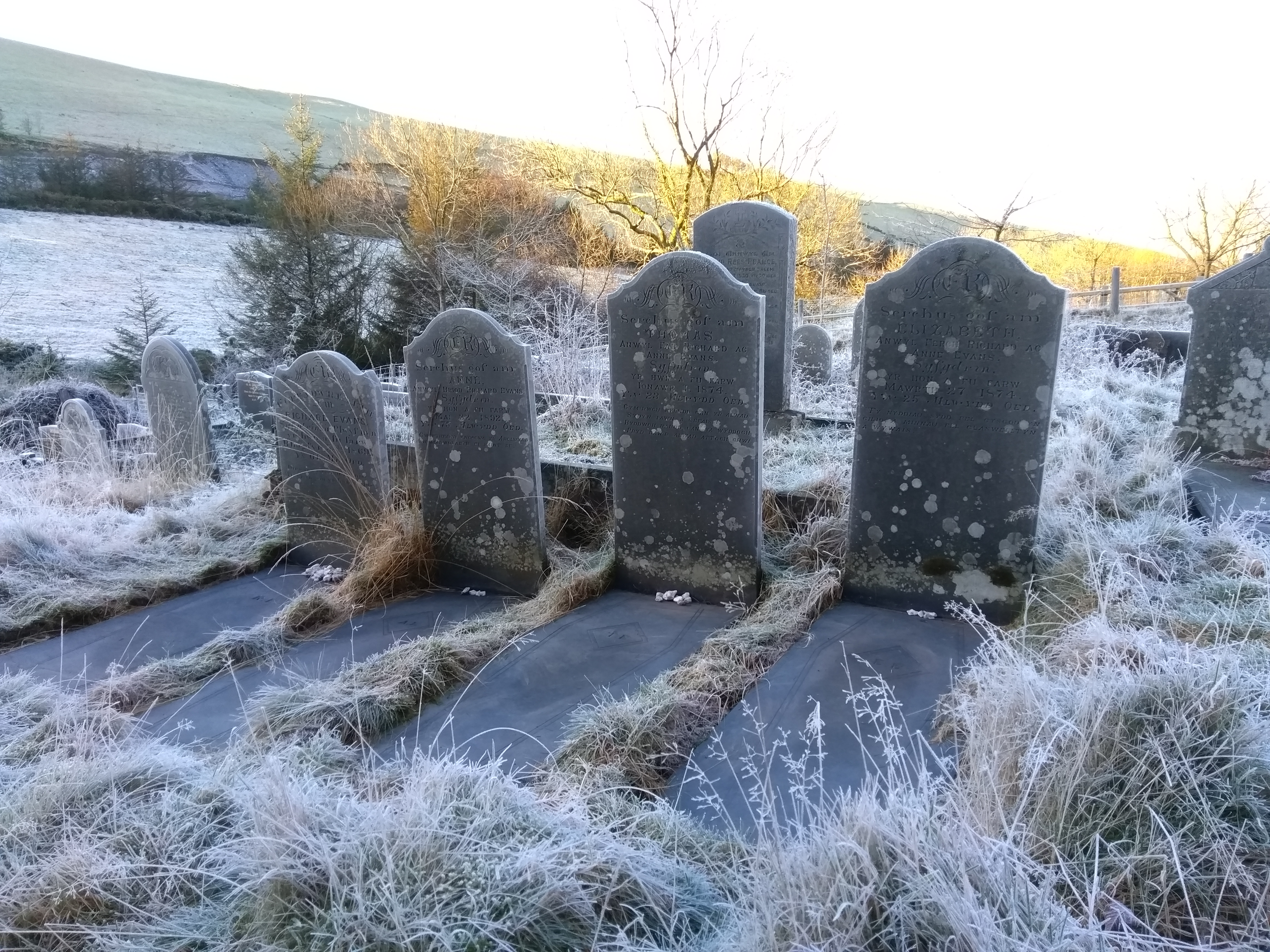
Graves in Chapel Graveyard

Today there is a chapel in the heart of the settlement, first built in 1843 and later rebuilt in 1860. Built from thick, rubble filled stone walls with fine detailing to the quoins and a welsh slate roof. This Tabernacle Welsh Baptist Chapel was established to serve the workers in the Cwmsymlog lead mines. The adjacent graveyard is the last resting place for several miners and their families. Many relatives of the interred still live locally. One of the more prominent graves is that of the mine captain. Cpt W. H. Boundy

The chapel fell into disuse towards the end of the 20th century and the building and graveyard began to decline. The Welsh Baptist Union sold the chapel in 2018. It is now in private ownership and the building and graveyard are undergoing restoration. With the brambles largely removed wild flowers and rare ferns are starting to appear.

There is also a ruin near Pant y Garreg Hir with the name Tŷ Mawr (Big House). This ruin was the chapel built for the miners by Sir Hugh Myddleton (1560–1631).

== Toponymy ==
The derivation of the name Cwmsymlog is debated. One suggestion is that it comes from 'cwm' meaning valley, 'mwsogl' meaning moss, and an adjectival ending '-og', giving the meaning 'mossy valley'. Another possibility is that it means 'valley of wild strawberries'.

== TV series ==
The police detective drama Y Gwyll (Hinterland) was first shown in 2013 in the Welsh version, but a year later also in English. It was shot in Ceredigion, especially Aberystwyth and surroundings, including Pontarfynach (Devil's Bridge) and Borth. Cwmsymlog featured in several episodes. The chapel was used for the dramatic conclusion to the first episode and one of the village houses was later dressed to create a pub.

== See also ==
- List of Sites of Special Scientific Interest in Ceredigion
