= List of Roman-to-modern scheduled monuments in Ceredigion =

Ceredigion is a large rural county in West Wales. It has a long coastline of Cardigan Bay to the west and the remote moorland of the Cambrian Mountains in the east, with the mountainous terrain of Plynlimon in the northeast. Ceredigion has a total of 264 scheduled monuments, which is too many for a single list page. For convenience the list is divided into two, the 163 prehistoric sites and the 101 sites from Roman to modern dates (shown below). Included on this page are 4 Roman military sites, 7 early Medieval sites, all inscribed or carved stones. The 39 high Medieval sites are overwhelmingly defensive settlements: everything from castles, mottes and ringworks to enclosures and deserted house sites. The notable exception is the abbey ruins at Strata Florida. From the post-medieval period, there are 17 deserted settlements, 5 bridges, 9 lead mines, 6 field defenses from World War II, and an assortment of other sites - a total of 51 post-medieval monuments. Ceredigion is both a unitary authority and a historic county. Historically the county was called Cardiganshire. Between 1974 and 1996 it was merged with Carmarthenshire and Pembrokeshire to form Dyfed.

All the pre-Roman sites are listed at List of Scheduled prehistoric Monuments in Ceredigion

Scheduled monuments (SAMs) have statutory protection. It is illegal to disturb the ground surface or any standing remains. The compilation of the list is undertaken by Cadw Welsh Historic Monuments, which is an executive agency of the National Assembly of Wales. The list of scheduled monuments below is supplied by Cadw with additional material from RCAHMW and Dyfed Archaeological Trust.

== Roman to modern scheduled monuments in Ceredigion ==
Image	Name	Site type	Community	Location	Details	Period	SAM No & Refs
View towards the fort site from the River Teifi	Llanio Roman Fort and Bathhouse (Bremia)	Fort	Llanddewi Brefi	52.1896°N 3.9851°W, SN643564	First century AD Roman fort on the banks of the River Teifi, beside the settlement of Llanio. Nearby Llanddewi Brefi supports its identification as the Roman fort named 'Bremia'.	Roman	CD129
	Roman Roads and Vicus W of Llanio Roman Fort	Fort	Llanddewi Brefi	52.1888°N 3.9877°W, SN642563	Roman Roads, including Sarn Helen, and the 'Vicus' (Roman extramural settlement) west of Llanio Roman Fort.	Roman	CD120
	Roman Fort 300m NW of Pen-Llwyn	Fort	Melindwr	52.4073°N 3.9852°W, SN650806	Identified from parchmarks in summer 1976. Triple ditch and walled fort enclosing 2.7 ha, part of series including Pennal, Trawsgoed and Llanio/Bremia. Finds from test excavations in 1980s suggest it was active from 75 to 120 AD. It overlooked a bridging point over Afon Rheidol.	Roman	CD134
	Trawscoed Roman Fort	Fort	Trawsgoed	52.3367°N 3.9523°W, SN670727	Only visible as parchmarks near the B4340 road, the Roman fort was built around 70 AD and occupied for over 50 years. It housed up to 800 infantry with a possible total population of 2,000 people.	Roman	CD119
	Four Inscribed Stones in Church	Inscribed stone	Llanddewi Brefi	52.1798°N 3.9556°W, SN663553		Early Medieval	CD047
	Llan-Llyr Inscribed Stone	Cross-marked stone	Llanfihangel Ystrad	52.1819°N 4.1319°W, SN543558		Early Medieval	CD112
	Sculptured Stone in Church	Decorated stone	Llangybi	52.141°N 4.0888°W, SN571512		Early Medieval	CD064
	Castle Hill Sculptured Stone (Moved into Llanilar Church)	Decorated stone	Llanilar	52.3566°N 4.0223°W, SN623750		Early Medieval	CD113
	Dyffryn-Bern Inscribed Stone	Inscribed stone	Penbryn	52.1341°N 4.5013°W, SN289513		Early Medieval	CD049
	Strata Florida Churchyard Cross	Cross	Ystrad Fflur	52.2757°N 3.8385°W, SN746657		Early Medieval	CD060
	Llanwnnws Inscribed Stone in Church	Cross-marked stone	Ystrad Meurig	52.3079°N 3.9299°W, SN685695		Early Medieval	CD111
	Blaenporth Mound and Bailey Castle	Motte & Bailey	Aberporth	52.111°N 4.5343°W, SN265488		Medieval	CD070
Aberystwyth Castle inner ward	Aberystwyth Castle	Castle	Aberystwyth	52.4133°N 4.0898°W, SN579815		Medieval	CD008
	Llwynduris Castle Mound	Motte	Beulah	52.0602°N 4.5719°W, SN237433		Medieval	CD009
	Llys Arthur, Dyffryn-Castell	Moated Site	Blaenrheidol	52.427°N 3.786°W, SN786825		Medieval	CD023
Cardigan Castle	Cardigan Castle	Castle	Cardigan	52.0815°N 4.6605°W, SN177459		Medieval	CD123
	Cardigan Town Walls	Town Wall	Cardigan	52.083°N 4.6602°W, SN178460		Medieval	CD141
	Old Castle Mound, Cardigan	Ringwork	Cardigan	52.0854°N 4.6804°W, SN164463		Medieval	CD116
	Castell Allt Craig-Arth	Castle	Dyffryn Arth	52.2389°N 4.2058°W, SN494623		Medieval	CD092
Gorse covered tamparts of Castell Gwallter	Castell Gwallter	Castle	Geneu'r Glyn	52.4616°N 4.0297°W, SN622867		Medieval	CD005
Lampeter castle mound, on campus at the university	Lampeter Castle Mound	Motte	Lampeter	52.1145°N 4.0761°W, SN579482		Medieval	CD110
	Blaen Brefi Longhouses	Longhouse	Llanddewi Brefi	52.1837°N 3.8855°W, SN711556		Medieval	CD185
	Cors Blaen Cothi Deserted Rural Settlement	Rectangular hut	Llanddewi Brefi	52.1238°N 3.9001°W, SN700489		Medieval	CD200
	Cyrnau Long Hut	Rectangular hut	Llanddewi Brefi	52.1618°N 3.8552°W, SN731531		Medieval	CD199
	Llethr Bryn y Gorlan Platform	House platform	Llanddewi Brefi	52.1674°N 3.8321°W, SN747537		Medieval	CD196
	Tomen Llanio	Motte	Llanddewi Brefi	52.2031°N 3.9612°W, SN660579		Medieval	CD022
	Adpar Castle Mound	Motte	Llandyfriog	52.0409°N 4.4663°W, SN309409		Medieval	CD104
	Castell Nant-y-Garan	Motte	Llandyfriog	52.0536°N 4.379°W, SN369421		Medieval	CD052
Castell Pistog	Castell Pistog	Motte	Llandyfriog	52.0381°N 4.3596°W, SN382403		Medieval	CD103
	Castell 585m NW of Pen-y-Rhiw	Enclosure	Llandysiliogogo	52.1731°N 4.4058°W, SN355554		Medieval	CD073
	Castell Caer Wedros	Motte	Llandysiliogogo	52.1762°N 4.3761°W, SN376557		Medieval	CD087
Castell Gwynionydd	Castell Gwynionydd	Ringwork	Llandysul	52.0543°N 4.3002°W, SN423420		Medieval	CD018
	Castell Hywel	Motte	Llandysul	52.1051°N 4.2786°W, SN440476		Medieval	CD084
	Tomen Rhyd-Owen	Motte	Llandysul	52.079°N 4.2722°W, SN443447		Medieval	CD076
	Castle Tan-y-Castell	Castle	Llanfarian	52.3907°N 4.0807°W, SN585789		Medieval	CD096
	Enclosure on Banc Pwlldrainllwyn	Enclosure	Llangwyryfon	52.3051°N 4.0275°W, SN618693		Medieval	CD151
	Llanwnnen Ring Motte	Ringwork	Llanwnnen	52.1031°N 4.1421°W, SN533471		Medieval	CD117
	Hafod Ithel Deserted Rural Settlement	Rectangular hut	Lledrod	52.2904°N 4.0272°W, SN618677		Medieval	CD193
	Castell Trefilan	Motte	Nantcwnlle	52.193°N 4.1242°W, SN549571		Medieval	CD077
	Bwlch-yr-Oerfa Settlement	Grange	Pontarfynach	52.3587°N 3.8166°W, SN763759		Medieval	CD149
	Hafod yr Abad Deserted Rural Settlement	Platform house	Pontarfynach	52.3696°N 3.6964°W, SN845759		Medieval	CD203
	Castell Gwar-Cwm	Motte	Trefeurig	52.4232°N 3.982°W, SN653824		Medieval	CD098
Domen Las Motte, covered in trees on the right	Domen Las	Motte	Ysgubor-y-coed	52.5539°N 3.9378°W, SN687968		Medieval	CD100
	Abandoned Settlement 300m NE of Troed-y-Rhiw	Deserted Rural Settlement	Ystrad Fflur	52.2808°N 3.8119°W, SN764662		Medieval	CD154
	Cwm Rhydol settlement	Longhouse	Ystrad Fflur	52.2886°N 3.8087°W, SN767671		Medieval	CD207
	Cwm-Meurig-Isaf Mound and Bailey Castle	Motte	Ystrad Fflur	52.293°N 3.8802°W, SN718677		Medieval	CD031
	Hafod Eidos Rural Settlement	Enclosure	Ystrad Fflur	52.2661°N 3.7988°W, SN773646		Medieval	CD179
Abbey ruins at Strata Florida	Strata Florida Abbey	Abbey	Ystrad Fflur	52.2752°N 3.8383°W, SN746657		Medieval	CD001
	Tir Hir Medieval Platform	House platform	Ystrad Fflur	52.2584°N 3.8235°W, SN756638		Medieval	CD184
	Ystrad Meurig Castle	Castle	Ystrad Meurig	52.2904°N 3.9035°W, SN702675		Medieval	CD032
Cenarth Bridge	Cenarth Bridge	Bridge	Beulah, (also Cenarth), (see also Carmarthenshire)	52.0456°N 4.5253°W, SN269415		Post-Medieval/Modern	CM017
	Banc Erw Barfe Deserted Rural Settlement	Rectangular hut	Blaenrheidol	52.387°N 3.8287°W, SN756781		Post-Medieval/Modern	CD176
Abandoned lead mine at Dyffryn Castell	Castell Lead Mine	Lead mine	Blaenrheidol	52.4155°N 3.8049°W, SN773812		Post-Medieval/Modern	CD153
	Esgair Naint Deserted Rural Settlement	Platform house	Blaenrheidol	52.4056°N 3.8009°W, SN775801		Post-Medieval/Modern	CD180
	Hen Bont, Pont-Erwyd	Bridge	Blaenrheidol	52.4116°N 3.8415°W, SN748808		Post-Medieval/Modern	CD006
	Lluest Nantycreuau Deserted Rural Settlement	Rectangular hut	Blaenrheidol	52.4001°N 3.7846°W, SN786795		Post-Medieval/Modern	CD188
Ponterwyd, Llywernog Silver Lead Mine Museum	Llywernog Lead and Silver Mine	Silver mine	Blaenrheidol	52.4124°N 3.8656°W, SN732810		Post-Medieval/Modern	CD158
	Nant y Baracs Deserted Rural Settlement	Longhouse	Blaenrheidol	52.4863°N 3.8328°W, SN756891		Post-Medieval/Modern	CD277
	Nant yr Helygen Deserted Rural Settlement	Platform house	Blaenrheidol	52.4085°N 3.7927°W, SN781804		Post-Medieval/Modern	CD181
Cardigan bridge	Cardigan Bridge	Bridge	Cardigan	52.0807°N 4.6607°W, SN177458		Post-Medieval/Modern	CD003
	Nant Bwlch-glas lluest farmstead	Deserted Rural Settlement	Ceulanamaesmawr	52.4656°N 3.8915°W, SN716869		Post-Medieval/Modern	CD208
	Waun Llechwedd Llyfn long hut	Deserted Rural Settlement	Ceulanamaesmawr	52.4582°N 3.8902°W, SN716861		Post-Medieval/Modern	CD209
	Fish Traps on Beach SW of Aberarth	Fish weir	Dyffryn Arth	52.2503°N 4.2408°W, SN471637		Post-Medieval/Modern	CD281
	Nant Gwyddel Deserted Rural Settlement	Rectangular hut	Llanddewi Brefi	52.1612°N 3.8281°W, SN750530		Post-Medieval/Modern	CD197
Bridge over River Teifi at Newcastle Emlyn	Newcastle Emlyn Bridge	Bridge	Llandyfriog, (also Newcastle Emlyn), (see also Carmarthenshire)	52.0404°N 4.4667°W, SN309408		Post-Medieval/Modern	CM087
	St Mary's Church / Llandyfriog Castle Mound	Church	Llandyfriog	52.0708°N 4.4179°W, SN343441		Post-Medieval/Modern	CD085
	Nanteos kennels/eyecatcher	Building (Unclassified)	Llanfarian	52.3828°N 4.0277°W, SN620780		Post-Medieval/Modern	CD205
Llechryd Bridge River Reifi Castell Malgwyn	Llechryd Bridge	Bridge	Llangoedmor, (also Manordeifi), (see also Pembrokeshire)	52.0623°N 4.601°W, SN218436		Post-Medieval/Modern	CD002
	Moated Site at Trefenter	Moated Site	Llangwyryfon	52.2944°N 4.0482°W, SN604682		Post-Medieval/Modern	CD127
	Aberstrincell or Graiglas Limekilns	Limekiln	Llansantffraid	52.2934°N 4.173°W, SN519683		Post-Medieval/Modern	CD155
	Lluest Pencraig Ddu Deserted Rural Settlement	Platform house	Melindwr	52.4274°N 3.8954°W, SN712827		Post-Medieval/Modern	CD178
	Bryn Diliw Long Hut	Rectangular hut	Pontarfynach, (also Llangurig), (see also Powys)	52.3838°N 3.7026°W, SN842775		Post-Medieval/Modern	CD191
Main building of Cwmystwyth lead mine	Cwmystwyth Mines, Copa Hill, Copper and Zinc Mines	Lead mine	Pontarfynach	52.3597°N 3.7542°W, SN806749		Post-Medieval/Modern	CD145
Sawmilling at the old Fron Goch lead mine.	Fron Goch Lead Mine	Lead mine	Pontarfynach	52.3532°N 3.8791°W, SN721744		Post-Medieval/Modern	CD146
	Nant Diliw Fechan Deserted Rural Settlement	Rectangular hut	Pontarfynach	52.3819°N 3.7031°W, SN841773		Post-Medieval/Modern	CD192
	Nant y Gafod Deserted Rural Settlement	Farmstead	Pontarfynach	52.3743°N 3.7016°W, SN842765		Post-Medieval/Modern	CD202
	Nant Yspryd Glan Deserted Rural Settlement	Rectangular hut	Pontarfynach	52.3871°N 3.7484°W, SN811780		Post-Medieval/Modern	CD195
The old sawmill Abermagwr	Abermagwr Sawmill	Sawmill	Trawsgoed	52.3458°N 3.9607°W, SN665737		Post-Medieval/Modern	CD133
	Blaen Cwmsymlog Lead and Silver Mine	Dam	Trefeurig	52.4367°N 3.9066°W, SN704837		Post-Medieval/Modern	CD201
	Bronfloyd Leadmine	Lead mine	Trefeurig	52.4328°N 3.9721°W, SN650834		Post-Medieval/Modern	CD152
Cwmsymlog Mine	Cwmsymlog Lead Mine	Silver mine	Trefeurig	52.4364°N 3.9136°W, SN700837		Post-Medieval/Modern	CD159
	Daren Lead Mine Workings & Adit	Lead mine	Trefeurig	52.4269°N 3.9502°W, SN674827		Post-Medieval/Modern	CD144
	Fagwyr Las Deserted Rural Settlement	House platform	Tregaron	52.222°N 3.8264°W, SN753597		Post-Medieval/Modern	CD177
	Hafod: Cavern Cascade	Grotto	Ysbyty Ystwyth	52.3389°N 3.7997°W, SN774727		Post-Medieval/Modern	CD171
	Hafod: Chain Bridge and Gothick Arcade	Bridge	Ysbyty Ystwyth	52.3464°N 3.8004°W, SN774735		Post-Medieval/Modern	CD172
	Hafod: Nant Bwlch-Gwallter	Stone	Ysbyty Ystwyth	52.3392°N 3.8197°W, SN761727		Post-Medieval/Modern	CD173
	Hafod: Peiran Cascade	Garden building	Ysbyty Ystwyth	52.3471°N 3.8054°W, SN771736		Post-Medieval/Modern	CD174
Bryndyfi mine	Bryndyfi Lead Mine	Lead mine	Ysgubor-y-coed	52.5224°N 3.9429°W, SN682933		Post-Medieval/Modern	CD126
	Dyfi Furnace	Ironworks	Ysgubor-y-coed	52.5378°N 3.9404°W, SN684950		Post-Medieval/Modern	CD128
	Pemprys Rural Settlement	Rectangular hut	Ysgubor-y-coed	52.53°N 3.8806°W, SN725941		Post-Medieval/Modern	CD198
Ystrad Einion Mine	Ystrad Einion Lead Mine Buildings and Water Wheel	Lead mine	Ysgubor-y-coed	52.5271°N 3.9074°W, SN706938		Post-Medieval/Modern	CD143
	Blaen Glasffrwd longhouse	Longhouse	Ystrad Fflur	52.2497°N 3.8024°W, SN770628		Post-Medieval/Modern	CD206
	Glasffrwd Holy Well	Well	Ystrad Fflur	52.2601°N 3.8184°W, SN759639		Post-Medieval/Modern	CD183
	Hafod Frith Deserted Rural Settlement	Rectangular hut	Ystrad Fflur	52.2821°N 3.786°W, SN782663		Post-Medieval/Modern	CD175
	St Ffraed's Well, Cynhawdre	Holy Well	Ystrad Meurig	52.2856°N 3.9448°W, SN674670		Post-Medieval/Modern	CD157
	Aberporth Range Simulated Ship Firing Platform	Dockyard	Aberporth	52.1425°N 4.5577°W, SN250524		Post-Medieval/Modern	CD213
Pillbox (Type Fw3-24), Aberystwyth Harbour	Aberystwyth Harbour Defences	Pillbox	Aberystwyth	52.406°N 4.089°W, SN579807		Post Medieval/Modern	CD248
	Airfield Perimeter Defences at Blaenannerch	Pillbox	Aberporth	52.1184°N 4.5629°W, SN246497		Post-Medieval/Modern	CD211
	Allt Hengeraint Pillbox	Pillbox	Henfynyw	52.2208°N 4.2401°W, SN470604		Post-Medieval/Modern	CD247
	Lampeter Pillbox	Pillbox	Lampeter	52.1096°N 4.0748°W, SN580477		Post-Medieval/Modern	CD249
	Pentre-Cwrt Pillbox	Pillbox	Llandyfriog	52.0286°N 4.3526°W, SN386393		Post-Medieval/Modern	CD260

Scheduled Monuments in Ceredigion, Wales.
=Prehistoric =Roman =Early Medieval
=Medieval =Post-Medieval/Modern

== See also ==
- List of Cadw properties
- List of castles in Wales
- List of hill forts in Wales
- Historic houses in Wales
- List of monastic houses in Wales
- List of museums in Wales
- List of Roman villas in Wales
