= Peaceful Places =

Tourism trail in Ceredigion, Wales

Peaceful Places is a heritage tourism trail, launched in 2014. The trail encompasses churches and chapels across the north of the Ceredigion county of Wales, each with its own story. There are 17 places to visit which can be found at Cardigan Bay, and in the valleys and hills of the Cambrian Mountains. The heritage contained within the places of worship span from pre-Christian to modern times.

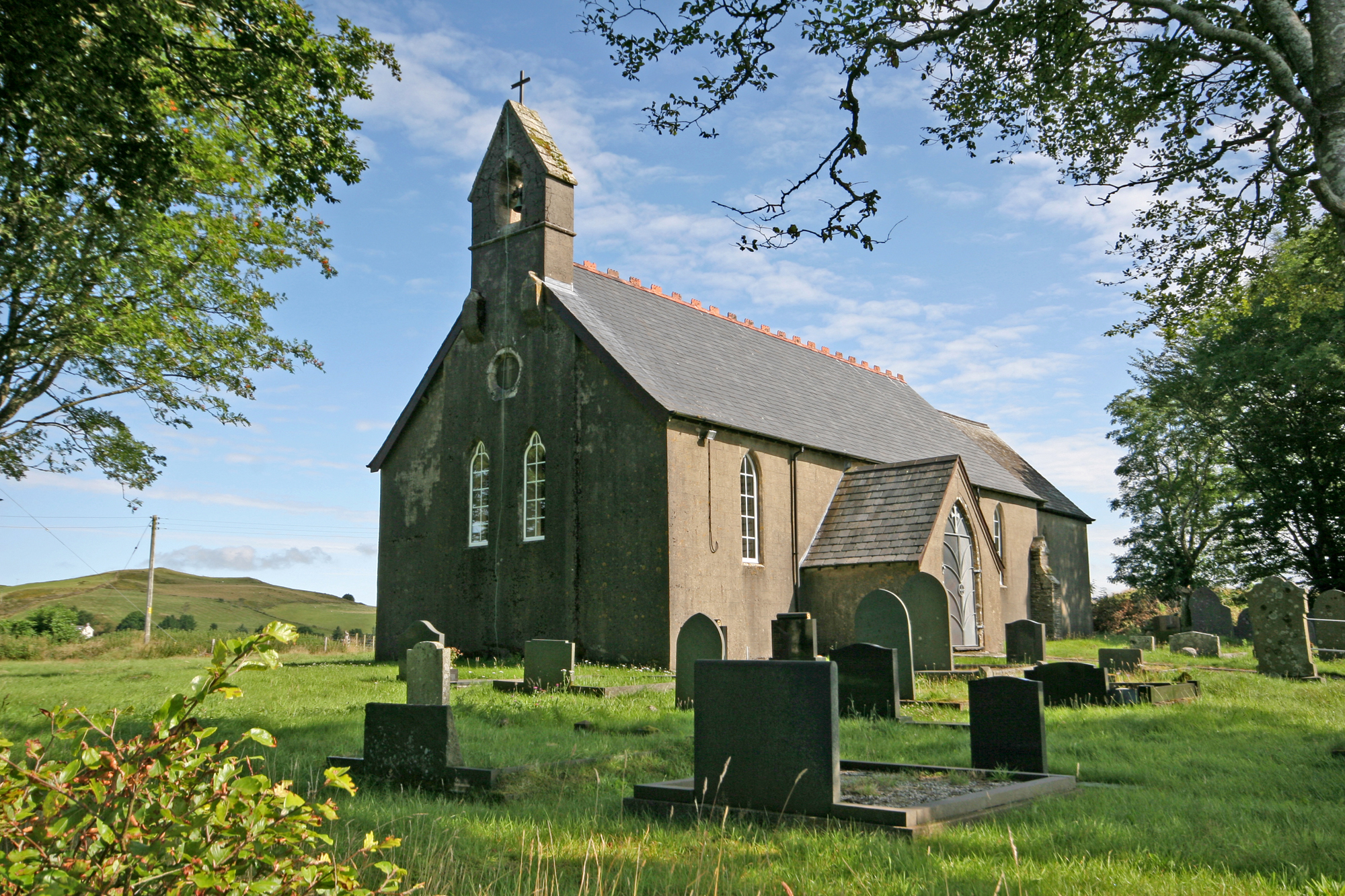
Llantrisant - The Church of the Three Saints, Wales

The trail spans 17 destinations, from the coast to the uplands, featuring flora and fauna, family history and human events and achievements. The trail offers short walking routes and also points visitors to examples of architecture, art and craftsmanship. The initial concept of the trail came from Roger Haggar, the church warden at Saint Michael's Church, who wanted to raise the profile of the churches and chapels in the area.

Peaceful Places was designed to drive tourism in Wales in response to the faith tourism action plan – the Welsh government aim to make faith tourism more a part of the visitor experience. Edwina Hart, the Economy Minister, said that religious places need to become an “integral part” of the visitor experience by 2020. John Watson encourages the uses of churches and chapels for tourism, commenting “If you're going to tell the story of Wales, you cannot tell it without religion”. The trail is designed to encourage visitors to see the sacred places from a different perspective; as places to spend time in a quiet setting. Peaceful Places was officially launched on 7 June 2014.

== The places ==
Place	Location	Description
St Michael and All Angels Church	Laura Place, Aberystwyth SY23 2AU	Overlooks the sea and lies within a conservation area which includes the grade one listed university building and the castle ruins.
St Matthew's Church	Borth (signposted from the sea front)	Views across to Aberdyfi, the Tarren mountains and the foothills of the Cambrian Mountains.
St David's Church	Capel Bangor, between Aberystwyth and Ponterwyd	Situated at the gateway to Rheidol Valley, surrounded by a wooded nature reserve, a river, a hydroelectric power station and an historic steam railway.
Capel Siloam	Cymystwyth	Lies on the Glyndwr Way walking route. Local history archive housed in the vestry.
St Michael's Church	Eglwysfach SY20 8SX. Situated on the tourist trail to Dyfi Furnace and the nearby Ynys-hir RSPB nature reserve.	The church dates from 1833 and an 18th-century lych gate remains from a previous older church.
St Peter's Church	Elerch (Bont-goch) SY24 5DP	St Peter's Church was designed by William Butterfield, an eminent Victorian architect.
St Michael and All Angels Church	Hafod SY25 6DX	Situated amongst woodland with trails for cyclists and walkers.The church was designed in 1803 by James Wyatt. There are remains of a Sir Frances Chantrey sculpture.
St Padarn's Church	Church Street, Llanbadarn Fawr SY23 3QZ	Ten bells in total - ringing on a Sunday morning.
St Michael's Church	Llandre SY24 5BZ (follow "Eglwys Church" signs)	Associated with a holy well and a yew tree, said to be around 2000 years old. Also has a 'Poetry Path'
St Michael and All Angels Church	Llanfihangel-y-Creuddyn SY23 4LA. Between Capel Seion and Devil's Bridge	Medieval church, built by the Welsh lords of Creuddyn. Sheep graze in the courtyard.
All Saints Church	Llangorwen SY23 3DW	Gothic church, built using local stone.
St Hilary's Church	Llanilar SY23 4SA	The church has a square tower which houses two bells.
Church of the Three Saints	Llantrisant SY23 4RL	The current church is 19th century in origin and stands in what appears to have been a circular graveyard.
St Mary's Church	Strata Florida SY25 6ES. Close to Pontrhydfendigaid.	The church lies beside the ruins of a Cistercian Abbey. The grave of Dafydd ap Gwilym is said to be here.
St John the Baptist Church	Ysbty Ystwyth. One mile south of Ponterwyd	The circular church graveyard houses large upright stones and the graves of the first recorded quadruplet babies.
St John the Baptist Church	Ysbyty Cynfyn SY25 6DE	The church dates back to approximately the 16th century. Another church was built in 1876 to cater for a large mining community.
Capel Ebenezer	Ystumtuen	Originally built in 1823.

== Gallery ==
Peaceful Places destinations
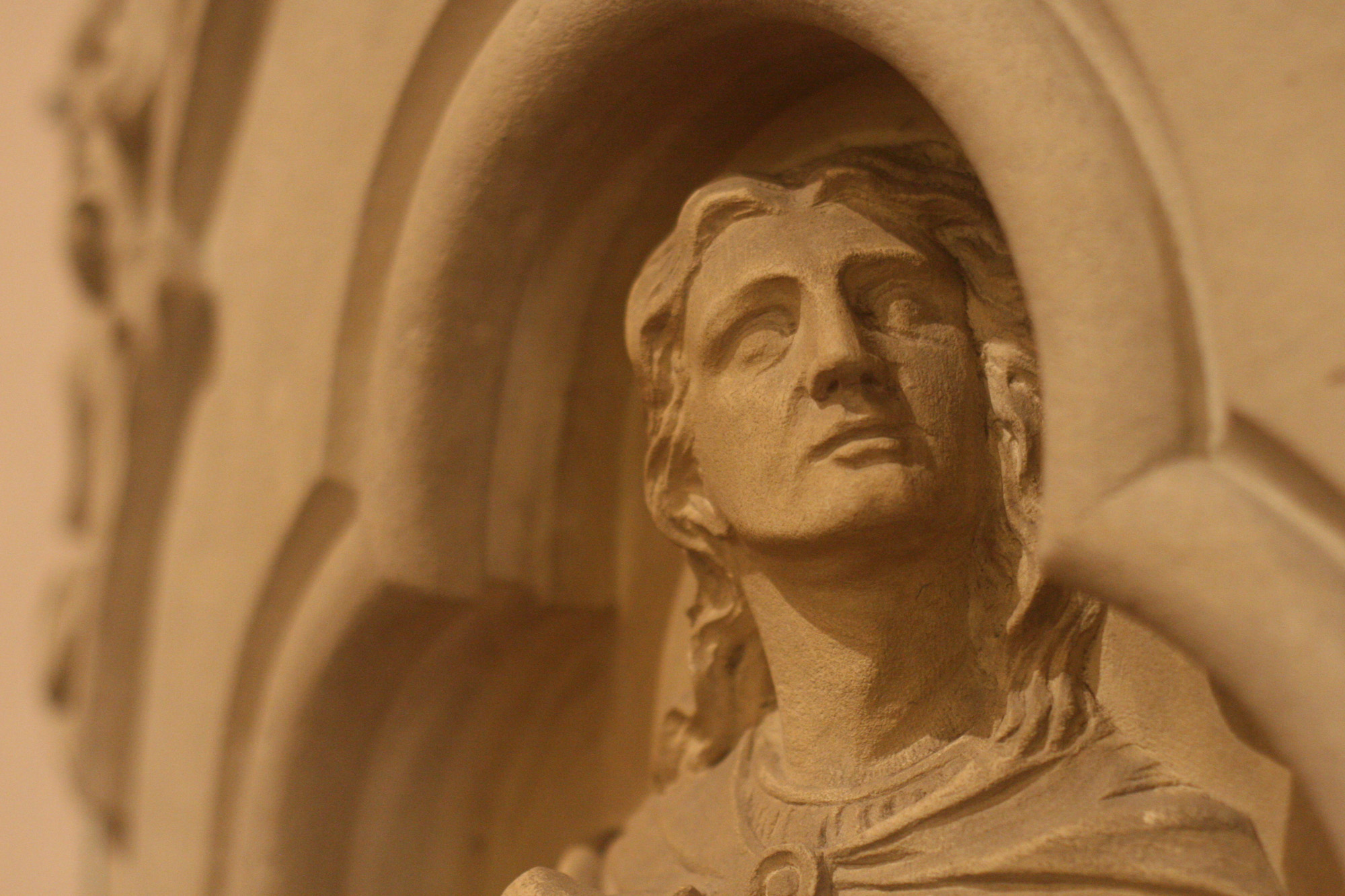
St Padarn's Church, Llanbadarn Fawr

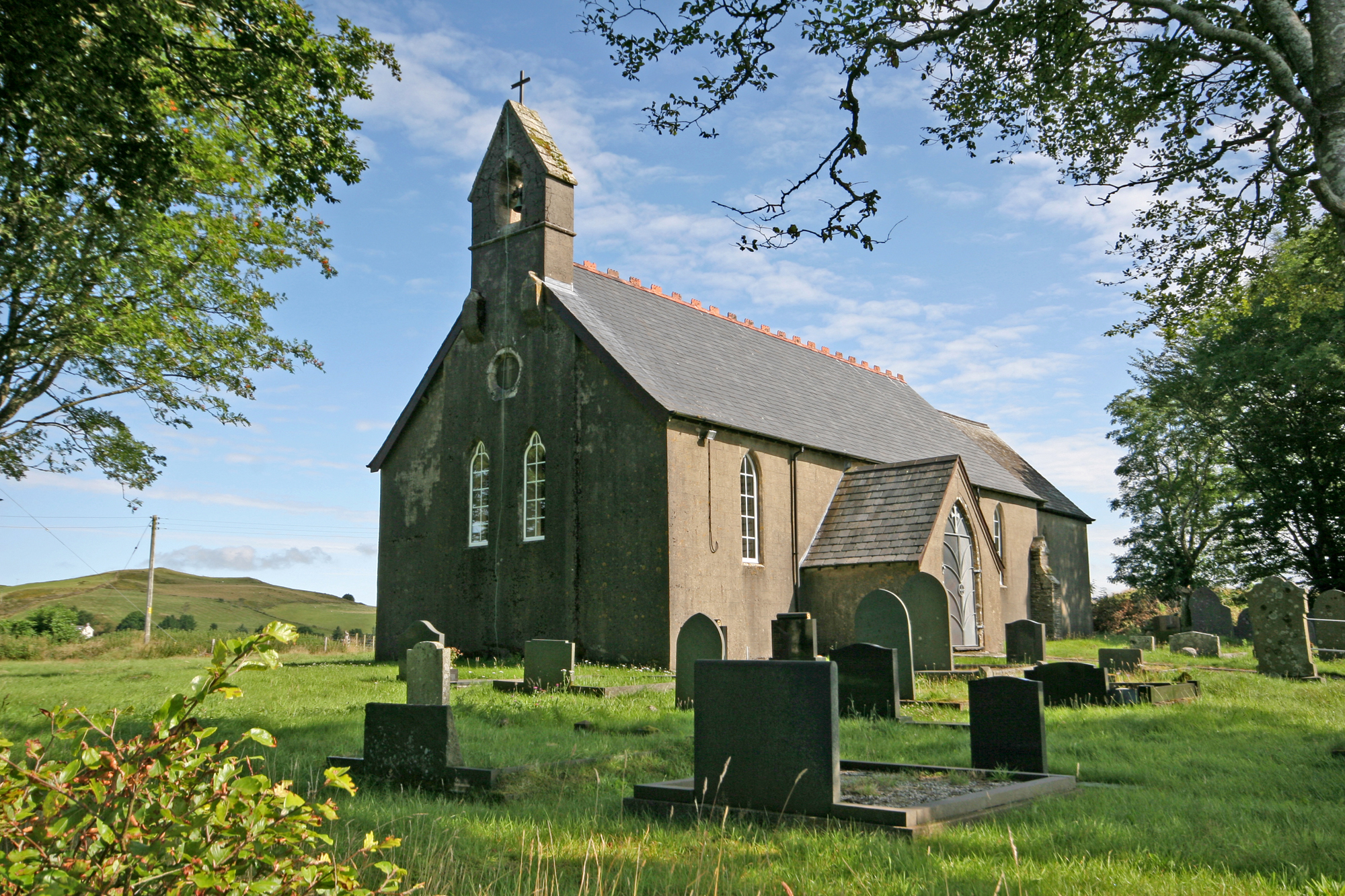
Llantrisant - The Church of the Three Saints

== Development ==
Peaceful Places was created by the North Ceredigion Churches Heritage Trail project, supported by Cadw’s Heritage Tourism Project with investment from the European Regional Development Fund (ERDF). It is managed by Treftadaeth Llandre Heritage, a community group interested in natural and cultural heritage that involves local people. The trail is supported by Churches Tourism Network Wales. The interpretive outputs of the project, such as displays, publications and the trail website, were developed by consultants Countryscape and Creu-Ad.

The Peaceful Places heritage trail was launched on 7 June 2014 at St Michael's church, Llandre. It was attended by Edwina Hart, the Minister for Tourism.
