= List of prehistoric scheduled monuments in Ceredigion =

Ceredigion is a large rural county in West Wales. It has a long coastline of Cardigan Bay to the west and the remote moorland of the Cambrian Mountains in the east, with the mountainous terrain of Plynlimon in the northeast. Ceredigion has a total of 264 scheduled monuments. That is too many to have on a single list page, so for convenience the list is divided into the 163 prehistoric sites (shown below) and the 101 Roman to modern sites. Included on this page are 13 Neolithic and Bronze Age standing stones and 3 stone circles. There are a large and diverse variety of burial cairns, mounds and barrows, mainly from the Bronze Age and mainly on the eastern uplands, accounting for some 79 sites. A further 70 defensive Iron Age sites such as hillforts and enclosures are found across the county. Ceredigion is both a unitary authority and a historic county. Historically the county was called Cardiganshire. Between 1974 and 1996 it was merged with Carmarthenshire and Pembrokeshire to form Dyfed.

All the Roman, early medieval, medieval and modern sites are listed at List of Scheduled Roman to modern Monuments in Ceredigion

Scheduled monuments (SAMs) have statutory protection. It is illegal to disturb the ground surface or any standing remains. The compilation of the list is undertaken by Cadw Welsh Historic Monuments, which is an executive agency of the National Assembly of Wales. The list of scheduled monuments below is supplied by Cadw with additional material from RCAHMW and Dyfed Archaeological Trust.

== Prehistoric scheduled monuments in Ceredigion ==
Image	Name	Site type	Community	Location	Details	Period	SAM No & Refs
	Moel y Llyn Stone Circle	Stone circle	Ceulanamaesmawr	52.5027°N 3.9153°W, SN700911	Some 33 stones set in a circle 19 metres (62 ft) across on exposed moorland, east of Tal-y-bont, near Fridd Newydd. Also called Cylch Derwyddol and Moel Llyn, it was first noted in 1847.	Prehistoric (Neolithic)	CD234
	Blaenannerch Round Barrow	Round barrow	Aberporth	52.1114°N 4.5576°W, SN249489		Prehistoric	CD212
	Bryn Rhosau Round Barrows	Round barrow	Blaenrheidol	52.4033°N 3.8633°W, SN733899		Prehistoric	CD097
	Cairn 400 m north of Lle'r Neuaddau	Round cairn	Blaenrheidol	52.4516°N 3.8274°W, SN759853		Prehistoric	CD043
Cairn Circle near Parson's Bridge	Cairn Circle 200 m NNW of Dolgamfa	Cairn circle	Blaenrheidol	52.3962°N 3.8448°W, SN745791		Prehistoric	CD228
	Cairn Circle 400 m southwest of Lle'r Neuaddau	Cairn circle	Blaenrheidol	52.4457°N 3.8325°W, SN755846		Prehistoric	CD042
	Cairn on Pen Lluest-y-Carn	Round cairn	Blaenrheidol	52.4638°N 3.766°W, SN801865		Prehistoric	CD038
	Cairns on Pen Plynlimon-Arwystli	Round cairn	Blaenrheidol	52.4751°N 3.7457°W, SN815877		Prehistoric	CD035
	Carn Fach Bugeilyn	Round cairn	Blaenrheidol, (also Trefeglwys), (see also Powys)	52.4986°N 3.7304°W, SN826903		Prehistoric	MG113
Carn Fawr, with views to Cadair Idris	Carn Fawr Round Cairns	Round cairn	Blaenrheidol	52.4998°N 3.7426°W, SN818905		Prehistoric	CD246
	Carneddau Round Cairns, Drosgol	Round cairn	Blaenrheidol	52.4745°N 3.8279°W, SN759878		Prehistoric	CD252
	Central Cairn on Pen Plynlimon-Fawr	Round cairn	Blaenrheidol	52.4669°N 3.7831°W, SN789869		Prehistoric	CD037
	Disgwylfa Fawr Round Barrow	Round barrow	Blaenrheidol	52.446°N 3.8592°W, SN737847	Excavated in 1937, An inhumation coffin and food vessels (now in the National Museum of Wales) are from early Bronze Age. 600 years later, a cremation burial had alo been made.	Prehistoric (Bronze Age)	CD030
	Garn Lwyd Round Cairn & Standing Stone	Standing stone	Blaenrheidol	52.434°N 3.8368°W, SN752833		Prehistoric	CD256
	Hengwm Ring Cairns	Ring cairn	Blaenrheidol	52.5044°N 3.7349°W, SN823910		Prehistoric	CD278
	North Cairn on Pen Plynlimon-Fawr	Round cairn	Blaenrheidol	52.4679°N 3.7827°W, SN789870		Prehistoric	CD036
	Round Barrow 290 m SSW of Nant-y-Moch	Round cairn	Blaenrheidol	52.464°N 3.8219°W, SN763866		Prehistoric	CD044
	Southernmost Cairn on Pen Plynlimon-Fawr	Round cairn	Blaenrheidol	52.4663°N 3.7834°W, SN789868		Prehistoric	CD150
	Stone Circle and Round Cairns, Hirnant	Stone circle	Blaenrheidol	52.439°N 3.8355°W, SN753839		Prehistoric	CD014
The summit of Y Garn	Y Garn (Plynlimon)	Round cairn	Blaenrheidol	52.4506°N 3.8031°W, SN775851		Prehistoric	CD034
	Y Garnedd, Hirnant	Round barrow	Blaenrheidol	52.4398°N 3.8346°W, SN753840		Prehistoric	CD041
Bedd Taliesin	Bedd Taliesin Round Barrow	Round cairn	Ceulanamaesmawr	52.5026°N 3.9587°W, SN671912		Prehistoric	CD067
	Bwlch yr Adwy Round Barrow	Round barrow	Ceulanamaesmawr	52.4651°N 3.8859°W, SN719869		Prehistoric	CD251
	Carn Owen, Cerrig yr Hafan	Round cairn	Ceulanamaesmawr	52.4772°N 3.868°W, SN732882		Prehistoric	CD045
Moel y Llyn trig point, set into one of the cairns	Moel y Llyn Cairn Cemetery	Cairn cemetery	Ceulanamaesmawr	52.5079°N 3.8981°W, SN712916		Prehistoric	CD239
	Pencraig y Pistill Round Cairn	Round cairn	Ceulanamaesmawr	52.4613°N 3.8921°W, SN715864		Prehistoric	CD250
	Standing Stone c. 280 m east of Tygwyn	Standing stone	Ceulanamaesmawr	52.4716°N 3.9331°W, SN687877		Prehistoric	CD236
	Two Cairns north of Moel y Garn	Round cairn	Ceulanamaesmawr	52.5072°N 3.9404°W, SN684916		Prehistoric	CD140
	Trichrug Round Barrows	Round cairn	Ciliau Aeron	52.2181°N 4.1353°W, SN542599		Prehistoric	CD061
	Llech Gron	Standing stone	Dyffryn Arth	52.2624°N 4.1372°W, SN542648		Prehistoric	CD093
	Penlan-Noeth, Round Barrow	Round barrow	Llanarth	52.149°N 4.2337°W, SN472524		Prehistoric	CD221
	Whilgarn Ring Cairn	Ring cairn	Llanarth	52.1419°N 4.2692°W, SN448517		Prehistoric	CD165
	Blaen Nant-y-Rhiw Round Cairn	Round cairn	Llanddewi Brefi	52.1657°N 3.8034°W, SN767534		Prehistoric	CD254
	Burnt Mound North of Glanrhocca	Burnt mound	Llanddewi Brefi	52.1652°N 4.0031°W, SN630537		Prehistoric	CD182
	Cairns and Ring Works south of Bryn Rhudd	Round cairn	Llanddewi Brefi	52.1802°N 3.9191°W, SN688552		Prehistoric	CD137
	Carn Saith-Wraig Round Cairns	Round cairn	Llanddewi Brefi	52.1614°N 3.7981°W, SN771529		Prehistoric	CD255
	Cefn Cnwcheithinog Standing Stone	Standing stone	Llanddewi Brefi	52.1313°N 3.8174°W, SN757496		Prehistoric	CD241
	Crug Round Cairn	Round cairn	Llanddewi Brefi	52.1602°N 3.9478°W, SN668531		Prehistoric	CD223
	Pen y Gurnos Round Barrow	Round barrow	Llanddewi Brefi	52.1466°N 3.7876°W, SN777513		Prehistoric	CD253
Grass-covered mound of Carn Penrhiwllwydog	Penrhiwllwydog Round Cairn	Round cairn	Llanddewi Brefi	52.1576°N 3.8437°W, SN739526		Prehistoric	CD240
	Round Cairns c. 400 m southeast of Lan Fawr	Round cairn	Llanddewi Brefi	52.1311°N 3.9095°W, SN693498		Prehistoric	CD210
	Stone Circle and Associated Structures on Bryn y Gorlan	Stone circle	Llanddewi Brefi	52.1763°N 3.8304°W, SN749546	A semi-circle of ten visible stones, up to 1 m high.	Prehistoric	CD136
	Blaen Glowen Round Barrow	Round barrow	Llandysiliogogo	52.1379°N 4.3407°W, SN399514		Prehistoric	CD088
	Crug Bach	Round barrow	Llandysiliogogo	52.1239°N 4.3743°W, SN375499		Prehistoric	CD086
	Crug Cou Round Barrow	Round barrow	Llandysiliogogo	52.151°N 4.3257°W, SN409528		Prehistoric	CD063
	Moelfryn Round Cairn	Round cairn	Llanfair Clydogau	52.1276°N 3.9627°W, SN657495		Prehistoric	CD115
	Awelon, Standing Stone 130 m	Standing stone	Llangwyryfon	52.275°N 4.0522°W, SN600660		Prehistoric	CD224
	Hafod Ithel Cairn Cemetery	Cairnfield	Llangwyryfon	52.2892°N 4.0395°W, SN609676		Prehistoric	CD132
	Carn Wen Round Cairn	Round cairn	Llangynfelyn	52.5167°N 3.9324°W, SN689927		Prehistoric	CD258
	Cerrig Blaencletwr-Fawr Round Cairn	Round cairn	Llangynfelyn	52.5157°N 3.9059°W, SN707925		Prehistoric	CD237
	Foel Goch Round Cairn	Round cairn	Llangynfelyn	52.5179°N 3.9247°W, SN695928		Prehistoric	CD257
	Llainwen Round Cairns	Round cairn	Llangynfelyn	52.5128°N 3.93°W, SN691922		Prehistoric	CD142
	Ynys Tudor Burial Mound	Round cairn	Llangynfelyn	52.5175°N 3.9621°W, SN669928		Prehistoric	CD130
	Coed Allt-Fedw Camp	Enclosure	Llanilar	52.3379°N 3.9659°W, SN661729		Prehistoric	CD025
	Pantcamddwr Ring Cairn	Ring cairn	Lledrod	52.2964°N 4.0031°W, SN634683		Prehistoric	CD131
Cairn on Mynydd Bach	Two Cairns on Mynydd Bach	Round cairn	Lledrod	52.289°N 4.0287°W, SN617675		Prehistoric	CD057
	Ty'n-yr-Eithin Round Cairn	Round barrow	Lledrod	52.298°N 4.01°W, SN630685		Prehistoric	CD226
	Buwch a'r Llo Standing Stones	Standing stone	Melindwr	52.4329°N 3.8815°W, SN721833		Prehistoric	CD231
	Nant Geifaes Cairn	Ring cairn	Melindwr	52.433°N 3.8669°W, SN731833		Prehistoric	CD232
	Round Barrow southwest of Pen-Rhiwlas	Round barrow	Melindwr	52.403°N 3.9045°W, SN705800		Prehistoric	CD118
	Round Cairn 460 m south of Ty'n-y-Rhos	Round cairn	Nantcwnlle	52.2079°N 4.1019°W, SN564587		Prehistoric	CD078
	Garreg Standing Stones	Standing stone	Penbryn	52.1521°N 4.4802°W, SN304533		Prehistoric	CD220
	Bwlch-y-Crwys Round Barrow	Round cairn	Pontarfynach	52.3812°N 3.8963°W, SN710776		Prehistoric	CD122
	Ffos Gau Ring Cairn	Ring cairn	Pontarfynach	52.3771°N 3.707°W, SN839768		Prehistoric	CD204
	Fron Ddu Round Barrow	Round barrow	Pontarfynach	52.3756°N 3.9077°W, SN702769		Prehistoric	CD124
	Pen y Garn Cairn	Round cairn	Pontarfynach	52.3785°N 3.7668°W, SN798770		Prehistoric	CD194
	Banc Troedrhiwseiri Ring Barrow	Ring barrow	Trefeurig	52.452°N 3.9616°W, SN667855		Prehistoric	CD238
	Carn Dol-Gau	Round cairn	Trefeurig	52.4267°N 3.8989°W, SN709826		Prehistoric	CD065
	Round Barrow & Standing Stone 700 m west of Plas Gogerddan	Round barrow	Trefeurig	52.4323°N 4.0219°W, SN626835		Prehistoric	CD259
	Standing Stone c. 500 m southwest of Llyn Pendam	Standing stone	Trefeurig	52.4342°N 3.9082°W, SN703835		Prehistoric	CD230
	Standing Stones c. 600 m northeast of Cwmdarren	Standing stone	Trefeurig	52.4353°N 3.9353°W, SN685836		Prehistoric	CD229
	Blean Camddwr Round Cairn	Round cairn	Tregaron	52.2142°N 3.8286°W, SN751589		Prehistoric	CD244
Bronze Age cairn on Bryn Cosyn	Bryn Cosyn Cairn Cemetery	Round cairn	Tregaron	52.2196°N 3.8463°W, SN739595		Prehistoric	CD245
	Cairn Cemetery on Esgair Gerwyn	Cist burial	Tregaron	52.2014°N 3.7543°W, SN802573		Prehistoric	CD135
	Cefncerrig Round Cairn	Round cairn	Tregaron	52.2065°N 3.8092°W, SN764580		Prehistoric	CD242
	Gwar-castell, round cairn pair	Round cairn	Tregaron	52.227°N 3.8689°W, SN724604		Prehistoric	CD215
	Nantymaen Standing Stone	Standing stone	Tregaron	52.209°N 3.8136°W, SN761583		Prehistoric	CD243
	Y Garn Round Cairn	Round cairn	Tregaron	52.2296°N 3.8577°W, SN732606		Prehistoric	CD216
	Gernos Mountain Round Barrow Cemetery	Round barrow	Troedyraur	52.0867°N 4.4007°W, SN356458		Prehistoric	CD218
	Rhydlewis Standing Stone Pair	Standing stone	Troedyraur	52.1024°N 4.4168°W, SN345476		Prehistoric	CD217
	Crug-Bychan Round Barrow	Round barrow	Y Ferwig	52.1282°N 4.6624°W, SN178511		Prehistoric	CD105
	Cairn south of Banc y Geufron	Round cairn	Ysbyty Ystwyth	52.316°N 3.8846°W, SN716703		Prehistoric	CD139
	Standing Stone c. 250 m NNE of Llethr	Standing stone	Ysbyty Ystwyth	52.3171°N 3.8477°W, SN741703		Prehistoric	CD235
	Blaen Glasffrwd Cairn Cemetery	Round cairn	Ystrad Fflur	52.2529°N 3.8015°W, SN771631		Prehistoric	CD138
	Bryn Eithinog Standing Stone	Standing stone	Ystrad Fflur	52.2555°N 3.8438°W, SN742635		Prehistoric	CD190
	Bryn-y-Crofftau Ring Cairn	Ring cairn	Ystrad Fflur	52.2546°N 3.8441°W, SN742634		Prehistoric	CD189
	Bryngwyn Bach Round Cairn Cemetery	Round cairn	Ystrad Fflur	52.2492°N 3.8642°W, SN728628		Prehistoric	CD227
Cairn near Carn Fflur's west top	Carn Fflur Round Cairn Cemetery	Round cairn	Ystrad Fflur	52.2458°N 3.844°W, SN742624		Prehistoric	CD186
Cairn at Garn Gron's west summit	Garn Gron Round Cairn Cemetery	Round cairn	Ystrad Fflur	52.2334°N 3.8466°W, SN740611		Prehistoric	CD219
	Burnt Mound 230 m northeast of Ffos	Burnt mound	Ystrad Meurig	52.287°N 3.9232°W, SN689671		Prehistoric	CD160
	Craig Ystradmeurig Round Cairn	Round cairn	Ystrad Meurig	52.3008°N 3.8995°W, SN705686		Prehistoric	CD214
	Nant Bryn Isaf Ring Cairn	Ring cairn	Ystrad Meurig	52.3167°N 3.9081°W, SN700704		Prehistoric	CD187
	Pen Dinas Camp	Hillfort	Aberystwyth	52.403°N 4.0825°W, SN584803		Prehistoric	CD007
	Onnen-Deg Defended Settlement	Promontory fort - inland	Beulah	52.0609°N 4.5786°W, SN233434		Prehistoric	CD162
	Pantdaniel Defended Enclosure	Enclosure	Beulah	52.0992°N 4.492°W, SN294474		Prehistoric	CD264
	Troed y Rhiw Sion Defended Enclosure	Promontory fort - inland	Beulah	52.0568°N 4.4943°W, SN290427		Prehistoric	CD265
	Dinas southwest of Aber-Peithnant	Hillfort	Blaenrheidol	52.4336°N 3.851°W, SN742833		Prehistoric	CD055
	Castell Nantperchellan	Enclosure	Cardigan	52.0582°N 4.6661°W, SN173433		Prehistoric	CD074
	Caer Lletty-Llwyd	Hillfort	Ceulanamaesmawr	52.4753°N 3.9877°W, SN650882		Prehistoric	CD101
	Pen Dinas Camp	Hillfort	Ceulanamaesmawr	52.4712°N 3.9489°W, SN677877		Prehistoric	CD102
	Pen y Castell	Hillfort	Ceulanamaesmawr	52.4455°N 3.9297°W, SN689848		Prehistoric	CD069
	Castell Perthi-Mawr	Hillfort	Ciliau Aeron	52.2093°N 4.1553°W, SN528589		Prehistoric	CD062
	Defended Enclosure 130 m EEN of Capel Ciliau Aeron	Enclosure	Ciliau Aeron	52.2044°N 4.1972°W, SN499585		Prehistoric	CD271
	Caer Allt-Goch Hillfort	Hillfort	Geneu'r Glyn	52.4763°N 4.0023°W, SN641883		Prehistoric	CD169
	Caer Pwll-Glas	Hillfort	Geneu`r Glyn	52.4607°N 4.0125°W, SN633866		Prehistoric	CD099
	Castell Allt-Goch	Hillfort	Lampeter	52.1314°N 4.0562°W, SN593501		Prehistoric	CD106
	Castell Olwen	Hillfort	Lampeter	52.1232°N 4.0752°W, SN580492		Prehistoric	CD161
	Castell 270 m east of Moeddyn-Fach	Hillfort	Llanarth	52.1399°N 4.2299°W, SN474514		Prehistoric	CD083
	Castell Moeddyn	Hillfort	Llanarth	52.145°N 4.2157°W, SN484519		Prehistoric	CD082
	Cwm Castell Iron Age Settlement	Hillfort	Llanarth	52.1758°N 4.2398°W, SN469554		Prehistoric	CD148
	Defended Enclosure 250 m northeast of Pont Henllan	Promontory fort - inland	Llandyfriog	52.0359°N 4.3954°W, SN357402		Prehistoric	CD276
	Promontory Fort SSW of Felin Cwrrws	Hillfort	Llandyfriog	52.0439°N 4.4051°W, SN351411		Prehistoric	CD039
	Castell Bach	Hillfort	Llandysiliogogo	52.1967°N 4.4003°W, SN360580		Prehistoric	CD068
	Pen Coed-Foel Camp	Hillfort	Llandysul	52.061°N 4.299°W, SN424427		Prehistoric	CD017
	Caer Morys	Hillfort	Llanfair Clydogau	52.1125°N 4.0132°W, SN622479		Prehistoric	CD114
	Castell Goetre	Hillfort	Llanfair Clydogau	52.1392°N 4.0426°W, SN603509		Prehistoric	CD107
	Gors Defended Enclosure	Enclosure - Defensive	Llanfarian	52.3749°N 4.0162°W, SN628771		Prehistoric	CD266
	Old Warren Hill Hillfort	Hillfort	Llanfarian	52.3889°N 4.0363°W, SN615787		Prehistoric	CD168
	Castell Cwmere	Hillfort	Llanfihangel Ystrad	52.1687°N 4.1463°W, SN533544		Prehistoric	CD079
	Cribyn Clottas	Hillfort	Llanfihangel Ystrad	52.142°N 4.1404°W, SN536514		Prehistoric	CD081
	Defended Enclosure 350 m east of Bank Green Grove	Enclosure	Llanfihangel Ystrad	52.1866°N 4.173°W, SN515564		Prehistoric	CD272
	Gaer Fach Defended Enclosure	Enclosure	Llanfihangel Ystrad	52.142°N 4.1476°W, SN531514		Prehistoric	CD273
	Gaer Maesmynach	Hillfort	Llanfihangel Ystrad	52.1361°N 4.1638°W, SN520508		Prehistoric	CD080
	Pen Clawdd-Mawr Defended Enclosure	Promontory fort - inland	Llanfihangel Ystrad	52.1775°N 4.1148°W, SN554553		Prehistoric	CD262
	Tre-Coll Hillfort	Hillfort	Llangeitho	52.2416°N 3.9913°W, SN641622		Prehistoric	CD163
	Gaer Wen	Enclosure	Llangrannog	52.1801°N 4.4202°W, SN346563		Prehistoric	CD072
	Maerdy Gaer	Enclosure	Llangrannog	52.1494°N 4.4073°W, SN353528		Prehistoric	CD090
	Pen Dinas Lochtyn	Hillfort	Llangrannog	52.1662°N 4.4641°W, SN315548		Prehistoric	CD071
	Ynys Lochtyn Defended Enclosure	Promontory fort - coastal	Llangrannog	52.1708°N 4.4663°W, SN314553		Prehistoric	CD275
	Caer Argoed	Hillfort	Llangwyryfon	52.3197°N 4.0321°W, SN615710		Prehistoric	CD051
	Gaer Coed Parc Hillfort and Enclosure	Hillfort	Llangybi	52.1433°N 4.0641°W, SN588514		Prehistoric	CD166
	Gaer Fawr	Hillfort	Llanilar	52.3284°N 3.9844°W, SN648718		Prehistoric	CD050
	Pant Mawr Hillfort	Hillfort	Llanilar	52.3612°N 4.0406°W, SN611756		Prehistoric	CD170
	Pen-y-Castell Group	Hillfort	Llanilar	52.3518°N 4.013°W, SN629745		Prehistoric	CD024
	Caer Penrhos	Hillfort	Llanrhystyd	52.305°N 4.125°W, SN552695		Prehistoric	CD094
	Defended Enclosure 500 m north of Pen y Castell	Enclosure - Defensive	Llanrhystyd	52.2965°N 4.1458°W, SN537686		Prehistoric	CD270
	Gilfach-Hafel Camp	Hillfort	Llanrhystyd	52.3097°N 4.115°W, SN559700		Prehistoric	CD095
	Castell Bwa-drain Camp	Hillfort	Melindwr	52.398°N 3.893°W, SN713794		Prehistoric	CD121
	Castell south of Goginan-Fach	Hillfort	Melindwr	52.419°N 3.9217°W, SN694818		Prehistoric	CD056
	Pen-y-Felin Wynt Hillfort	Hillfort	Melindwr	52.3867°N 3.9389°W, SN681782		Prehistoric	CD167
	Tan-y-Ffordd Hillfort	Hillfort	Melindwr	52.4005°N 3.923°W, SN692797		Prehistoric	CD164
	Pen-y-Gaer Defended Enclosure	Promontory fort - inland	Nantcwnlle	52.2048°N 4.0832°W, SN577583		Prehistoric	CD261
	Castell Bach	Hillfort	Penbryn	52.154°N 4.4826°W, SN302535		Prehistoric	CD091
	Castell Nadolig	Hillfort	Penbryn	52.1257°N 4.4868°W, SN298504		Prehistoric	CD053
	Castell south of Pen-y-Foel	Hillfort	Penbryn	52.129°N 4.4242°W, SN341506		Prehistoric	CD089
Hen Gaer	Hen Gaer Hilltop Enclosure	Hillfort	Tirymynach	52.4403°N 4.0127°W, SN632843		Prehistoric	CD026
	Castell Grogwynion	Hillfort	Trawsgoed	52.3356°N 3.8782°W, SN721724		Prehistoric	CD012
	Cefn Blewog Camp	Enclosure	Trawsgoed	52.3348°N 3.9137°W, SN697724		Prehistoric	CD011
	Coed Ty'n-y-Cwm Camps	Promontory fort - inland	Trawsgoed	52.3453°N 3.9285°W, SN687736		Prehistoric	CD125
	Llannerch Pentir Defended Enclosure	Promontory fort - inland	Trawsgoed	52.3571°N 3.927°W, SN688749		Prehistoric	CD267
	Camp near Garth-Penrhyn-Coch	Enclosure	Trefeurig	52.4376°N 3.9753°W, SN658840		Prehistoric	CD027
	Daren Camp	Hillfort	Trefeurig	52.429°N 3.9447°W, SN678829		Prehistoric	CD028
	Castell Flemish	Hillfort	Tregaron	52.2505°N 3.9728°W, SN654632		Prehistoric	CD021
	Castell Rhyfel	Hillfort	Tregaron	52.2224°N 3.8577°W, SN732598		Prehistoric	CD066
	Sunnyhill Wood Camp	Hillfort	Tregaron	52.2241°N 3.9238°W, SN686601		Prehistoric	CD108
	Dinas Cerdin	Hillfort	Troedyraur	52.0975°N 4.358°W, SN385469		Prehistoric	CD016
	Nant Barre Caerau	Hillfort	Troedyraur	52.1186°N 4.3963°W, SN360494		Prehistoric	CD054
	Cardigan Island Defended Enclosure	Enclosure - Defensive	Y Ferwig	52.1323°N 4.6896°W, SN160516		Prehistoric	CD280
	Craig y Gwbert Defended Enclosure	Promontory fort - coastal	Y Ferwig	52.1195°N 4.691°W, SN158502		Prehistoric	CD274
	Gilfach y Dwn Fawr Defended Enclosure	Hillfort	Ystrad Fflur	52.2666°N 3.8572°W, SN733647		Prehistoric	CD269
	Pen y Bannau Camp	Hillfort	Ystrad Fflur	52.2855°N 3.846°W, SN741668		Prehistoric	CD109
	Gareg-lwyd Defended Enclosure	Enclosure	Ystrad Meurig	52.3102°N 3.9067°W, SN701697		Prehistoric	CD268
	Pen y Ffrwd-Llwyd Camp	Hillfort	Ystrad Meurig	52.3019°N 3.8943°W, SN709687		Prehistoric	CD033

Scheduled Monuments in Ceredigion, Wales.
=Burial sites =Standing stones =Hillforts etc

== See also ==
- List of Scheduled Roman to modern Monuments in Ceredigion
- List of Cadw properties
- List of castles in Wales
- List of hill forts in Wales
- Historic houses in Wales
- List of monastic houses in Wales
- List of museums in Wales
- List of Roman villas in Wales
