= Green Grove =

Green Grove may refer to:

== Places ==
- Green Grove, Ceredigion, a village in the community of Llanfihangel Ystrad, Ceredigion, Wales
- Green Grove, New Jersey, an unincorporated community in Monmouth County, New Jersey, United States
- Green Grove, Wisconsin, a town in Clark County, Wisconsin, United States

== Fictional entities ==
- Green Grove Retirement Community, the fictional retirement community where Tony Soprano, Paulie Gualtieri, and other Mafiosi admit their mothers, in The Sopranos
