= Ffair Rhos =

Village in Ceredigion, Wales

Coordinates: 52.295353°N 3.849863°W

- Location within Ceredigion
- OS grid reference: SN 7394 6797
  - Cardiff: 63.2 mi (101.7 km)
  - London: 167.8 mi (270.0 km)
- Community: Ystrad Fflur
- Principal area: Ceredigion
- Country: Wales
- Sovereign state: United Kingdom
- Post town: Tregaron
- Postcode district: SY25
- Police: Dyfed-Powys
- Fire: Mid and West Wales
- Ambulance: Welsh
- UK Parliament: Ceredigion Preseli
- Senedd Cymru – Welsh Parliament: Ceredigion

Ffair Rhos (also known as Ffair-rhos) is a small village in the community of Ystrad Fflur, Ceredigion, Wales, which is 63.2 miles (101.8 km) from Cardiff and 167.8 miles (270 km) from London. Ffair Rhos is represented in the Senedd by Elin Jones (Plaid Cymru) and the Member of Parliament is Ben Lake (Plaid Cymru). The village has a campsite and a pub.

The village's name translates to "Rhos Fair," reflecting its historical market of sheep and other livestock. An ancient road converging here is the Monks’ Trod. During the 19th century, Ffair Rhos reached its peak as a base for surrounding lead mines, such as Eshairmwyn and Lisburne. The village is also associated with Welsh folklore. Most notable of these legends was the legend of the Brwcsod, a group of 19th century locals with a mining background who allegedly targeted and robbed wealthy travelers passing between surrounding mountains.

== See also ==
- List of localities in Wales by population
