= Green Grove, Ceredigion =

Village in Ceredigion, Wales

Coordinates: 52.186213°N 4.178922°W

Green Grove
- Location within Ceredigion
- OS grid reference: SN 5114 5646
  - Cardiff: 64.9 mi (104.4 km)
  - London: 179.1 mi (288.2 km)
- Community: Llanfihangel Ystrad
- Principal area: Ceredigion
- Country: Wales
- Sovereign state: United Kingdom
- Post town: Aberaeron
- Postcode district: SA48
- Police: Dyfed-Powys
- Fire: Mid and West Wales
- Ambulance: Welsh
- UK Parliament: Ceredigion Preseli
- Senedd Cymru – Welsh Parliament: Ceredigion

Green Grove is a small village in the community of Llanfihangel Ystrad, Ceredigion, Wales, which is 64.9 miles (104.4 km) from Cardiff and 179.1 miles (288.2 km) from London. Green Grove is represented in the Senedd by Elin Jones (Plaid Cymru) and is part of the Ceredigion Preseli constituency in the House of Commons.

== See also ==
- List of Scheduled prehistoric Monuments in Ceredigion
- List of localities in Wales by population
