= Hen Gaer =

Hillfort in Ceredigion, Wales

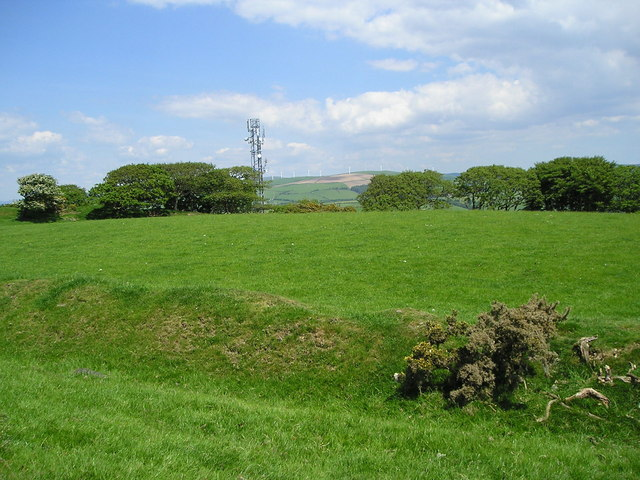
- Looking north-east across Hen Gaer

- Location within Ceredigion
- 52.4403°N 4.0127°W
- Type: Hillfort
- Periods: Iron Age
- Location: Near Bow Street, Ceredigion, Wales
- OS grid reference: SN 633 844

Hen Gaer is an Iron Age hillfort, on a hill adjacent to and east of Bow Street, Ceredigion, Wales.

Other names of the hillfort are Broncastellan and Caer Shon.

== Description ==
Hen Gaer ("Old Castle") is smaller than a typical tribal fortification. It is strongly defended; the single rampart is about 12 metres (39 ft) wide and 3–4 metres (10–13 ft) above the interior, with a rock-cut external ditch. On the north-east side, carefully laid stone blocks of the original rampart wall can be seen. The main entrance is on the west side. There is a circular mound outside the entrance: it is not an earlier barrow, but may be a defensive feature.

The enclosed area includes some of the southern hillslope; it is thought this may have been to make the fortification visible from the narrow valley below, at the confluence of Afon Stewi and Nant Seilo forming Afon Clarach.

== See also ==
- Hillforts in Britain
- List of Scheduled prehistoric Monuments in Ceredigion
