= Pontrhydfendigaid =

Village in Ceredigion, Wales

Coordinates: 52.282289°N 3.862837°W

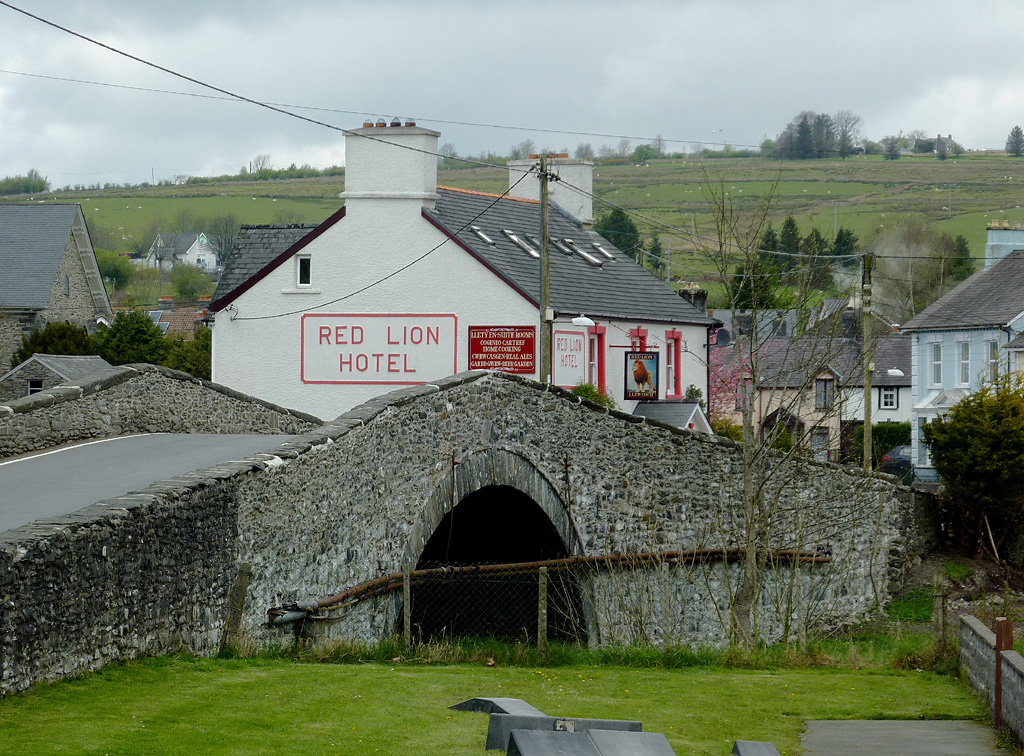
- Bridge and hotel in Pontrhydfendigaid

- Location within Ceredigion
- Population: 712
- OS grid reference: SN730666
  - Cardiff: 90 mi (140 km)SE
- Principal area: Ceredigion
- Preserved county: Dyfed
- Country: Wales
- Sovereign state: United Kingdom
- Post town: YSTRAD MEURIG
- Postcode district: SY25
- Dialling code: 01974
- Police: Dyfed-Powys
- Fire: Mid and West Wales
- Ambulance: Welsh
- UK Parliament: Ceredigion Preseli
- Senedd Cymru – Welsh Parliament: Ceredigion Penfro

Pontrhydfendigaid (Welsh pronunciation: [pɔntˌr̥idvɛnˈdiɡai̯d]) is a village in Ceredigion, Wales. It lies on the western flank of the Cambrian Mountains, between Devil's Bridge and Tregaron. The village lies on the River Teifi, whose source is just 3 miles (5 km) to the east at Llyn Teifi. The community of Ystrad Fflur, which Pontrhydfendigaid makes most of the population of, had a population of 712 as of 2011 census.

The ruins of the Cistercian Strata Florida Abbey are 1 mile south-east of the village. The abbey was founded 1164; the poet Dafydd ap Gwilym is traditionally said to be buried there and Llywelyn the Great held a council there. The station at Strata Florida was positioned to serve the village. The hillfort of Pen y Bannau is 1 km east of the village.

The village is home to an annual eisteddfod, the Eisteddfod Pantyfedwen, or colloquially the "Steddfod Bont". Concerts and other events are also held in the modern multi-purpose Pavilion here. A Celtic Music Society is based at the village's Black Lion Hotel.

The village was the birthplace and home of Caradog Jones, the first Welshman to reach the summit of Mount Everest.

It is in the Community of Ystrad Fflur.

The village takes its name from an old ford (rhyd) across the Teifi and a bridge (pont) that was later built there. It is on the B4343 road between Tregaron to the south and Pontarfynach to the north, around 13 miles (21 km) to the south-east of Aberystwyth.

The abbey was an important centre of learning, and it is believed that one of the earliest versions of the Brut y Tywysogion was made there.

It is believed that the TV programme C'mon Midffild! is based on the village football club.

== Pontrhydfendigaid in fiction ==
In the novel The Discovery of Heaven by Dutch author Harry Mulisch, the village is the place where the characters Mr and Mrs Spiers spend their holidays.

== The Beast of Bont ==
The Beast of Bont is the name given to a big cat said to roam the area centred on Pontrhydfendigaid. (Y Bont is the local abbreviation and colloquial name for Pontrhydfendigaid.) It was blamed for the death of 12 sheep in June 1981. After a number of livestock attacks in the mid-1990s, Ministry of Agriculture veterinarians inspected a sheep carcass "and declared that the killer was a great deal more powerful than a fox or dog". The Dyfed-Powys police then searched the area, but failed to find the animal.

In the spring of 2012, Mark Davey and his partner Annette came across a "sickening" scene: two large groups of slaughtered sheep, about two miles apart, in the hills near Devil's Bridge. In a statement to local newspapers, he reported that "something had quite clearly attacked them because they looked like they had been ripped apart" and that "to kill so many sheep in such a small area it had to be quite a strong animal".
