= Castell Nadolig =

Hillfort in Ceredigion, Wales

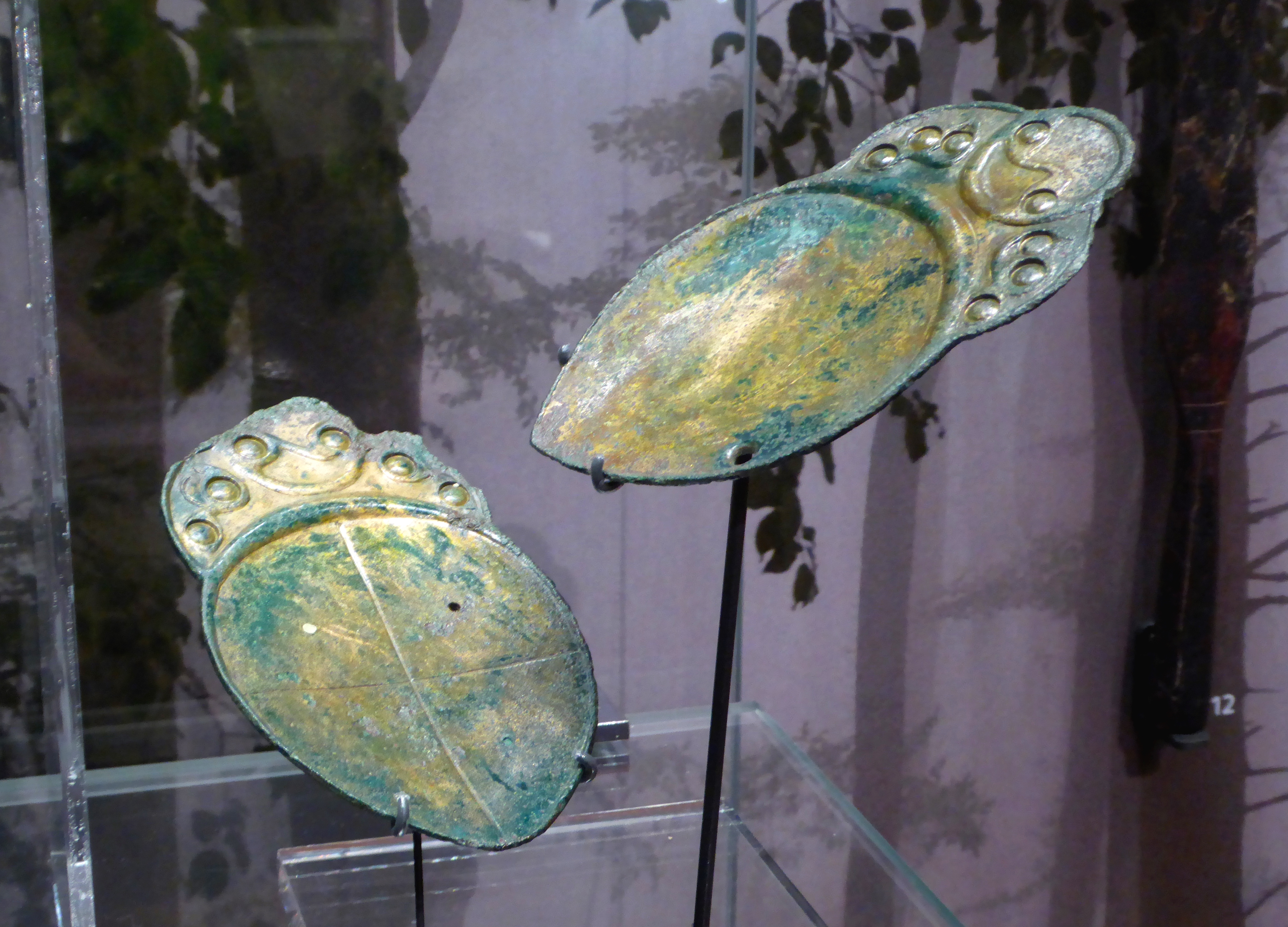
- The Penbryn Spoons, found at the hillfort

- Location within Ceredigion
- 52°7′32″N 4°29′12″W
- Type: Hillfort
- Periods: Iron Age
- Location: Near Aberporth, Wales
- OS grid reference: SN 298 504

Castell Nadolig ('Christmas Castle') is an Iron Age hillfort, about 2.5 miles (4 km) east of the village of Aberporth and about 1 mile (2 km) south of the village of Penbryn, in Ceredigion, Wales. It is a scheduled monument. The Penbryn Spoons, of the late Iron Age, were found here.

== Description ==
The fort, sited on a low summit, is next to the A487 road to the south, which here may be the course of an ancient ridgeway. There are two concentric banks, the outer defence measuring about 230 metres (750 ft) west–east by 185 metres (607 ft) north–south, enclosing 3.8 hectares (9.4 acres), and the inner defence measuring about 130 metres (430 ft) by 78 metres (256 ft), enclosing 0.84 hectares (2.1 acres).

There is a wide space of about 60 metres (200 ft) between the banks; this is thought to have aided the defence of the site, which is not in a strong position. The space between may have also served for penning the stock. The surviving ramparts are 2–3 metres (6 ft 7 in – 9 ft 10 in) high and 7–10 metres (23–33 ft) wide at the base, now forming parts of hedgebanks. There are crossbanks between the concentric defences, built in more recent times to create fields.

By the inner rampart on the south-west side, a pool of water marks a prominent rock-cut spring, and there are other springs in nearby fields; these may have influenced the choice of the site.

The hillfort's name is first attributed as 'Kastell Yn Dolig' in a 1571/2 manuscript, and later in 1594 is recorded as ‘Castell Nadolig’, although why this title was chosen for the site is currently not known.

== Penbryn Spoons ==
In 1829, two objects of cast bronze were found by a tenant farmer beneath a heap of stones in the hillfort. Known as the "Penbryn Spoons", they were donated in 1836, by the Rev. Henry Jenkins, to the Ashmolean Museum in Oxford.

From the decoration on the short handles, it is thought that they date from 50 BC to AD 100. One of the spoons has a small hole on one side, and the bowl of the other has an incised cross that divides it into four areas. It is thought that they may have been used for foretelling the future, liquid being poured from the spoon with the hole onto the other spoon. About 25 spoons like these have been found, usually in pairs, in Britain, Ireland and northern France.

== See also ==
- Hillforts in Britain
- List of Scheduled prehistoric Monuments in Ceredigion
