= Monks Trod =

Road in Wales

Monks Trod is a byway open to all traffic in Wales, developed originally by Cistercian monks between the twelfth century abbeys of Cwm-Hir, near Llandrindod Wells, and Strata Florida, near Tregaron, Ceredigion.

Monks Trod runs for more than 5 miles (8.0 km) in Powys as a byway across the Cambrian Mountains, and then crosses into Ceredigion, becoming a 1 mile (1.6 km) stretch of unclassified road. The 6 miles (9.7 km) section between Pont ar Elan beside the Craig Goch Dam reservoir, and Strata Florida passes over a natural peat moorland, designated as a National Nature Reserve Claerwen (NNR), Site of Special Scientific Interest (Elenydd SSSI), Special Protection Area (Elenydd – Mallaen), and a Special Area of Conservation.

In 1990, as a result of widespread damage to the SSSI section, a Traffic Regulation Order (TRO) was placed on the Monks' Trod, banning four-wheeled vehicles only. In 2002 a temporary TRO was imposed, banning all motor traffic, including motorcycles.

The TRO banning motorcycles came to an end on 20 October 2021, and it is currently, once again, legally open to vehicles with two wheels.

While the TRO was in place, Natural Resources Wales along with independent ecological specialists looked at the likely effects of carrying out surfacing and drainage work on the iconic byway which is notorious for its boggy and difficult ground. A complex environmental assessment – known as a Habitat Regulations Assessment – was carried out, to identify what effect any proposed repairs and improvements to the route within Powys might have on the whole of the area, which is designated as a Special Area for Conservation. The assessment concluded that the council will not be able to proceed with any proposed surfacing works at this current time.

The status of the byway is under constant review, and user groups are encouraged to be ever-mindful that if the route is not respected, then it is likely to be permanently closed. It is estimated that it would cost in excess of £300,000 to repair the route.
