= Ysbyty Cynfyn =

Hamlet in Ceredigion, Wales

Coordinates: 52.395222°N 3.834147°W

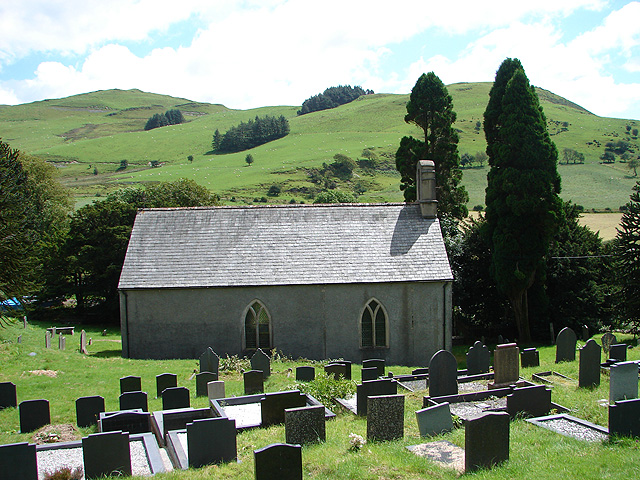
- Church of St John the Baptist

- Location within Ceredigion
- OS grid reference: SN 7529 7905
  - Cardiff: 69.1 mi (111.2 km)
  - London: 169.3 mi (272.5 km)
- Community: Blaenrheidol
- Principal area: Ceredigion
- Country: Wales
- Sovereign state: United Kingdom
- Post town: Aberystwyth
- Postcode district: SY23
- Police: Dyfed-Powys
- Fire: Mid and West Wales
- Ambulance: Welsh
- UK Parliament: Ceredigion Preseli
- Senedd Cymru – Welsh Parliament: Ceredigion Penfro

Ysbyty Cynfyn is a hamlet in the community of Blaenrheidol, Ceredigion, Wales, which is 69.1 miles (111.3 km) from Cardiff and 169.3 miles (272.4 km) from London.

The Parish Church of St John the Baptist was built in the early 19th century, replacing a previous one. The oldest gravestone dates from 1793 and first recorded quadruplet babies were buried in the churchyard in 1856. The walls of the churchyard have incorporated a pre-historic stone circle.

== See also ==
- List of localities in Wales by population
