= Pennant, Ceredigion =

Village in Ceredigion, Wales

Coordinates: 52.247737°N 4.177694°W

Pennant
- Location within Ceredigion
- OS grid reference: SN 5143 6330
  - Cardiff: 68.1 mi (109.6 km)
  - London: 180.2 mi (290.0 km)
- Community: Dyffryn Arth
- Principal area: Ceredigion
- Country: Wales
- Sovereign state: United Kingdom
- Post town: Aberystwyth
- Postcode district: SY23
- Police: Dyfed-Powys
- Fire: Mid and West Wales
- Ambulance: Welsh
- UK Parliament: Ceredigion Preseli
- Senedd Cymru – Welsh Parliament: Ceredigion Penfro

Pennant is a village in the community of Dyffryn Arth, Ceredigion, Wales. Pennant is represented in the Senedd by Elin Jones (Plaid Cymru) and is part of the Ceredigion Preseli constituency in the House of Commons.
