= Pontrhyd-Saeson =

Village in Ceredigion, Wales

Coordinates: 52.247187°N 4.135603°W

Pontsaeson
- Location within Ceredigion
- OS grid reference: SN 5430 6315
  - Cardiff: 66.9 mi (107.7 km)
  - London: 178.4 mi (287.1 km)
- Community: Dyffryn Arth
- Principal area: Ceredigion
- Country: Wales
- Sovereign state: United Kingdom
- Post town: Aberystwyth
- Postcode district: SY23
- Police: Dyfed-Powys
- Fire: Mid and West Wales
- Ambulance: Welsh
- UK Parliament: Ceredigion Preseli
- Senedd Cymru – Welsh Parliament: Ceredigion

Pontrhyd-Saeson is a hamlet in the community of Dyffryn Arth, Ceredigion, Wales, which is 66.9 miles (107.7 km) from Cardiff and 178.4 miles (287 km) from London. Pontsaeson is represented in the Senedd by Elin Jones (Plaid Cymru) and is part of the Ceredigion Preseli constituency in the House of Commons.

== See also ==
- List of localities in Wales by population
