= Ystrad Einion =

Village in Ceredigion, Wales

Coordinates: 52.527511°N 3.905508°W

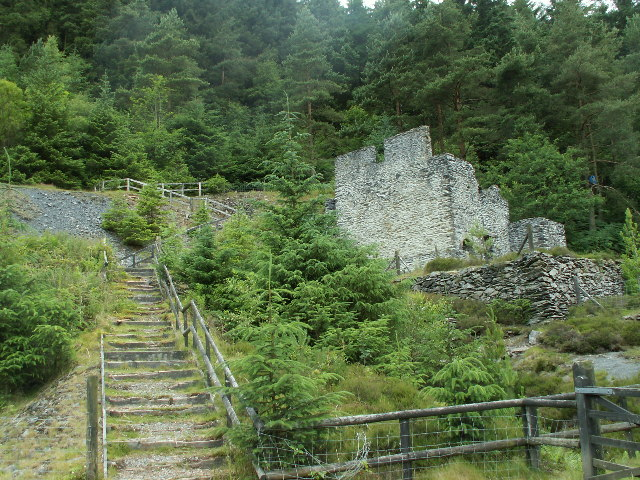
- Ystrad Einion Mine

- Location within Ceredigion
- OS grid reference: SN 7083 9389
  - Cardiff: 78.7 mi (126.7 km)
  - London: 175.4 mi (282.3 km)
- Community: Ysgubor-y-coed
- Principal area: Ceredigion
- Country: Wales
- Sovereign state: United Kingdom
- Post town: Machynlleth
- Postcode district: SY20
- Police: Dyfed-Powys
- Fire: Mid and West Wales
- Ambulance: Welsh
- UK Parliament: Ceredigion Preseli
- Senedd Cymru – Welsh Parliament: Ceredigion

Ystrad Einion or Ystrad-Einion is a small village in the community of Ysgubor-y-coed, Ceredigion, Wales, which is 78.7 miles (126.7 km) from Cardiff and 175.4 miles (282.2 km) from London.

Ystrad Einion is represented in the Senedd by Elin Jones (Plaid Cymru) and is part of the Ceredigion Preseli constituency in the House of Commons.

Zinc, silver, lead and copper were mined at Ystrad Einion, which is located in Cwm Einion (Artist's Valley).

== See also ==
- List of localities in Wales by population
