= Llangwyryfon =

Village and community in Ceredigion, Wales

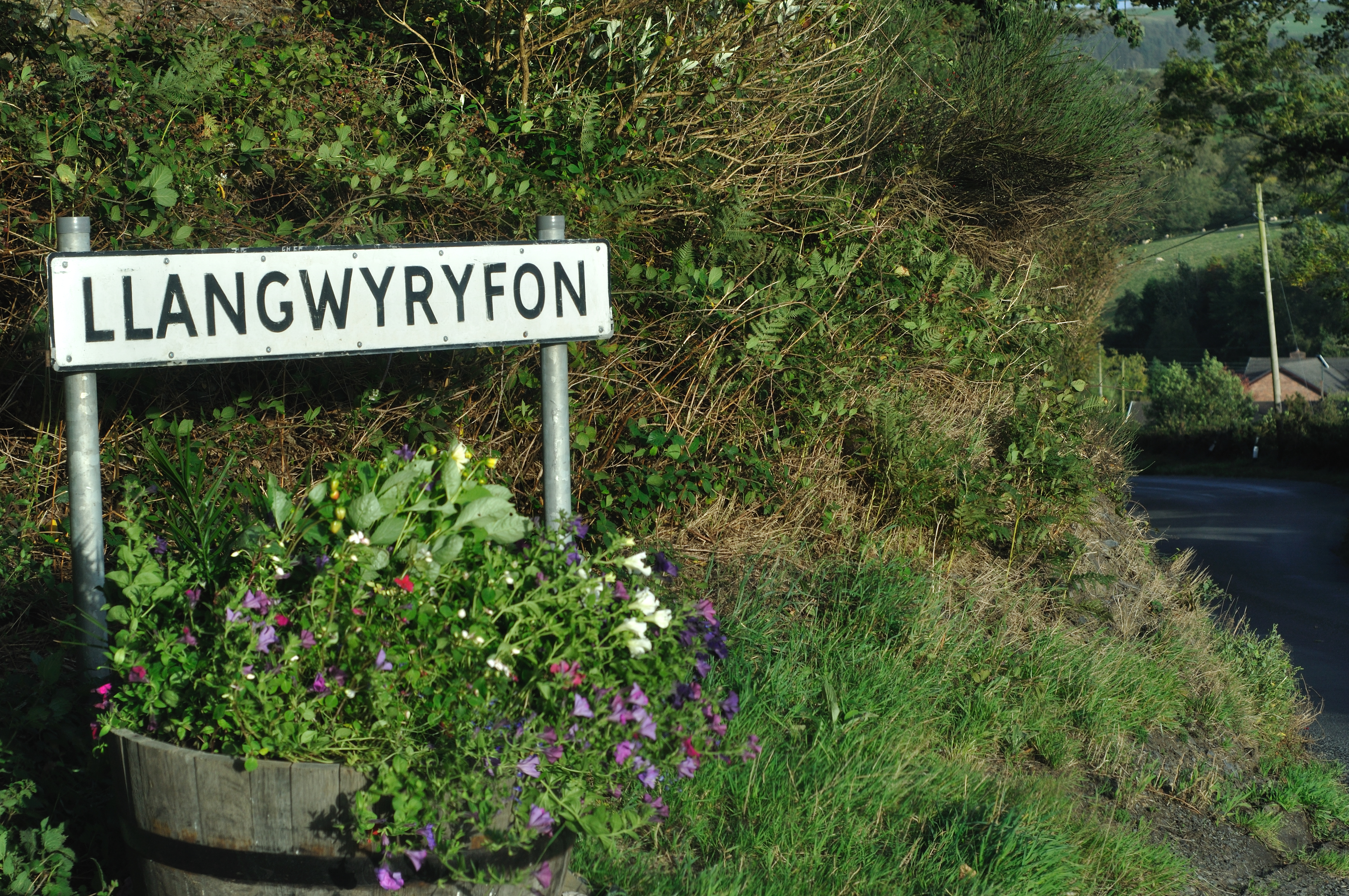
- Llangwyryfon road sign

- Location within Ceredigion
- Population: 596 (2011)
- OS grid reference: SN599707
  - Cardiff: 93 mi
- Principal area: Ceredigion
- Preserved county: Dyfed
- Country: Wales
- Sovereign state: United Kingdom
- Post town: LLANRHYSTUD
- Postcode district: SY23
- Post town: ABERYSTWYTH
- Postcode district: SY23
- Dialling code: 01974
- Police: Dyfed-Powys
- Fire: Mid and West Wales
- Ambulance: Welsh
- UK Parliament: Ceredigion Preseli
- Senedd Cymru – Welsh Parliament: Ceredigion Penfro
- List of places UK Wales Ceredigion 52.316°N 4.057°W Community map: Map of the community

Llangwyryfon is a village and community in the county of Ceredigion, Wales. It lies on the B4576 about 8 miles to the south and east of Aberystwyth. The village lies in the valley of the River Wyre and contains the roadbridge where the B4576 crosses the Wyre downstream of which lies the confluence of the rivers Beidiog and the Wyre. Llangwyryfon has boundaries with Llanrhystud, Llanilar, Dyffryn Arth, Llangeitho and Lledrod communities.

== Etymology ==
The name Llangwyryfon derives from the tale of the Romano-British Saint Ursula to whom the village church is dedicated. Llan is an ancient Welsh word for a holy enclosure and gwyryfon refers to the 11,000 virgins who are said to have been martyred along with Saint Ursula.

== History ==
There is an Iron Age site in the village at Caer Argoed. In 1942(?) an early medieval, 5th-6th century carved stone was found in a field in the village by a farmer ploughing the field.

== Amenities ==
There is a general store in the village (now closed) as well as a church and a chapel.

=== Clubs and societies ===
- Young Farmers Club
- Women's Institute
- Merched Y Wawr
- Gardening Club
- Youth Club

== Transport ==
The village is served by the 588 bus service which runs between Aberystwyth and Lampeter.

== Education ==
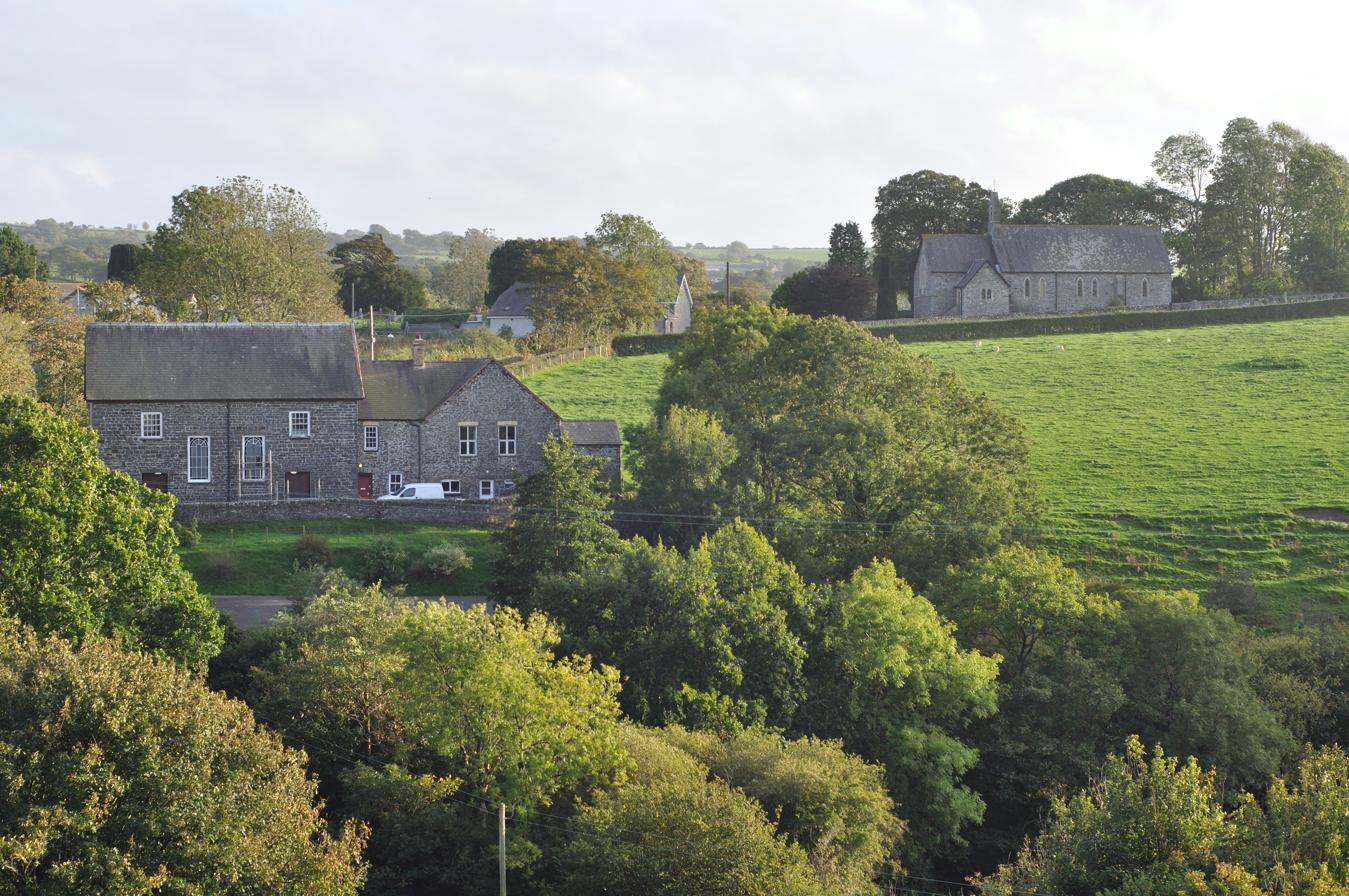
Llangwyryfon Church and Chapel

Llangwyryfon Community Primary School is located in the village. In 2007 the School had 42 pupils.

Cylch Meithrin Llangwyryfon is a playgroup in Llangwyryfon registered by the Mudiad Ysgolion Meithrin. The group is based in the Community Hall, Neuadd Santes Ursula (English: Saint Ursula Hall), near the Church.

Llangwyryfon is in the catchment area of the two secondary schools in Aberystwyth, Penweddig Community Secondary School (Welsh: Ysgol Gyfun Gymunedol Penweddig) and Penglais School.

== Industry ==
- The main industry in the area is livestock farming.
- There is a scrapyard in the village.
- Llangwyryfon Wind Farm is split between Llangwyryfon and Lledrod, it is a wind farm of 20 wind turbines.
