= Bont Goch =

Village in Ceredigion, Wales

Coordinates: 52.459733°N 3.938023°W

Bont-goch
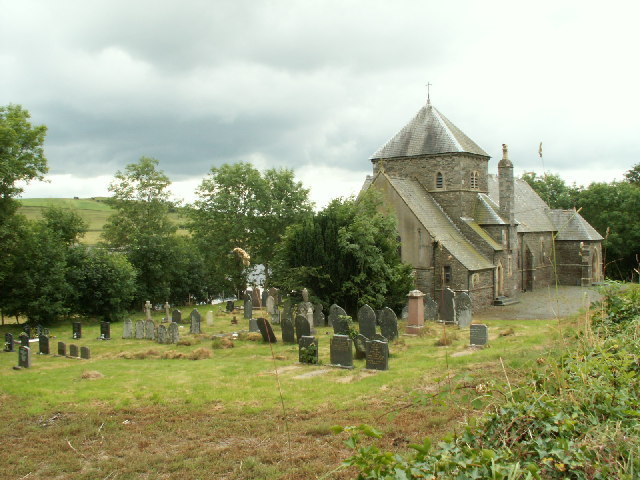
- St Peter's Church, Bontgoch

- Location within Ceredigion
- OS grid reference: SN 6842 8641
  - Cardiff: 75.1 mi (120.9 km)
  - London: 175 mi (282 km)
- Community: Ceulanamaesmawr
- Principal area: Ceredigion
- Country: Wales
- Sovereign state: United Kingdom
- Post town: Borth
- Postcode district: SY24
- Police: Dyfed-Powys
- Fire: Mid and West Wales
- Ambulance: Welsh
- UK Parliament: Ceredigion Preseli
- Senedd Cymru – Welsh Parliament: Ceredigion Penfro

Bont Goch (also known as Bontgoch or Elerch) is a village in Ceredigion, Wales, 2 miles (3.2 km) northeast of Aberystwyth. With Talybont, it is in the community of Ceulanamaesmawr.

The historic name was Elerch (the Welsh word for 'swan'; also recorded as a male personal name), which may be related to the name of the river Leri which flows through the area. The modern name Bontgoch in Welsh means "the red bridge".

== Population ==
The population of the parish in 1929 was 185. There are now about 53 properties in Bont Goch. In 2005, a survey noted "that in recent years the village has experienced a remarkable regeneration, with an influx of younger couples moving back into the area, and that the village now has 30 children under fifteen years of age, 22 of whom were born in Bontgoch."

== Early history ==
The village is in the valley of the river Leri. The original settlement was by the bridge, hence the name "Bont Goch" or "Red Bridge".

There is a medieval holy well, with a possible Dark Age dedication to St Padarn. There are also several Bronze Age burnt mounds or hearths, and what may be a Bronze Age standing stone.

The earliest mine appears to have been at Llanerch-clydau, which is said to be "quite ancient... worked in the 17th century, but not later".

The area remained, however, essentially rural. By the late 18th century the Crosswood and Court Grange estates had landholdings in the area. The Crosswood estate maps in the National Library of Wales show that there was very little settlement or enclosure in the 18th century, with just a few cottages on unenclosed moorland, and a single small farm surrounded by a few small fields and woodland on steeper slopes. There were still some metal mines.

== The Gilbertson family ==
In about 1818, the Gilberston family moved to Plas Cefn Gwyn, Elerch, now a Grade II listed building, situated about 500 metres north east of what is now the church. Plas Cefn Gwyn was built in about 1818 for William Cobb Gilbertson (1768–1854).

William Cobb Gilbertson came from Shadwell in London in about 1789 and settled first in Plas Dolclettwr, Llangynfelyn, before moving to Plas Cefn Gwyn, Elerch, in about 1818, as shown by baptismal records. The house at Plas Cefn Gwyn was built for him. He was appointed as an Attorney at the Court of the King's Bench in 1791. He became a deputy lieutenant of Cardiganshire and a captain in the Cardiganshire battalion for Supplementary Militia in 1797, at the time of the Fishguard invasion. He became a Justice of the Peace for Cardiganshire in 1800, and a Commissioner, under the Income Act, for Genau'r-glyn and Llanbadarn, Cardiganshire. In 1802 he became a Commissioner for managing Stamp Duty and of the Property Act in 1803.

His son, the Reverend Lewis Gilbertson B.D. (1814–1896) spent his youth at Elerch. He was educated at Jesus College, Oxford, graduating B.A. in 1836 (M.A. 1839, B.D. 1847). He was a Fellow of Jesus College, 1840–72. He was ordained deacon in 1837 by the bishop of Gloucester and Bristol and started his clerical career as curate of Sheringham, near Cheltenham before being ordained priest in 1838. From 1841 until 1852 he was vicar of Llangorwen, Cardiganshire, where he became known for his connection with the Oxford Movement. He introduced Tractarian practices such a daily service (in Welsh), a weekly Eucharist and the singing of Gregorian Chant. In 1852 he returned to Jesus College and after a period as junior bursar and lecturer (1852–1855) became Vice-Principal in 1855, a position he retained until 1872. He was responsible for the construction of three very fine buildings in the village: a school, a church and a vicarage. He was a follower of the Oxford Movement, which is reflected in his choice of medieval revivalist architecture of high quality.

He had a school built in 1856, followed by a church in 1865–1868, and a vicarage in 1874, using nationally regarded architects. The architect of the school was George Edmund Street (who went on to design the Royal Courts of Justice in the Strand). The architect of the church was William Butterfield. The architect of the vicarage (Elerch Vicarage) was John Prichard.

Gilbertson became the first vicar of Elerch in April 1869, but exercised his right as patron to appoint a successor in November 1870, becoming rector of Braunston in Northamptonshire (a position within the gift of Jesus College) that same year. He was rector of Braunston until retiring to Aberystwyth in 1893, where he died on 2 April 1896. His widow had a stained-glass window erected in the Jesus College chapel in his memory, which includes a picture of Archbishop William Laud.

He left a son, Rev. Canon Lewis Gilbertson, M.A., who donated the family papers to the National Library of Wales in 1927.

== Revival of lead mining ==
In the second half of the nineteenth century, the population was boosted by new work in new lead mines, and houses were built in a settlement adjacent to the present church. No doubt the school, church and vicarage were constructed in order to reflect and serve the larger and more concentrated population of the village which sprang up to house the lead miners.

The miners worked in the hills behind the village. The Mynydd Gorddu Mine, Bontgoch (Elerch) was a small mine about 1.5 km west south west of the village. A trial trench was dug in 1848 and in 1870 a seam of lead glance was found. By 1884, output of the mine was up to 901 tons of lead ore and 183 tons of zinc ore. Mining appears to have ceased by 1900.

== Wind farm ==
In 1997, Mynydd Gorddu became the site of a windfarm, which continues to operate there. The nineteen 35m tall turbines were each originally installed with a 10.8MW yield. The turbines' internal machinery has since been upgraded, giving he wind farm an expected P50 energy yield of 26GWh. Mynydd Gorddu wind farm is now estimated to generate an output equivalent to the annual consumption of 6,318 homes.

== Listed buildings ==
The village contains a number of listed buildings, including the church, the vicarage and the school built by Lewis Gilbertson.

The other listed buildings are Plas Cefn Gwyn, a small non-conformist chapel with a house attached, and a 19th-century mill.

The last class in the school was the class of 1958, consisting of four boys and three girls.

== Church of St Peter ==
The parish church of St Peter designed in 1865 by renowned Victorian architect William Butterfield on the instructions of the Reverend Lewis Gilbertson is a Grade II* listed building. It was originally constituted as a chapelry of the Llanbadarn Fawr parish with a priest with the status of a perpetual curate who was allowed an income of £150 per annum. Before the construction of the church, the parish was contained with the parishes of Llanbadarn Fawr and Llanfihangel Genau'r-Glyn. There is stained glass by Alexander Gibbs (1868). The baptismal register begins in 1865 and the registers of marriage and burial begin in 1868. There are two Second World War burials in the churchyard

== Political representation ==
Bont-goch is represented in the Senedd by Elin Jones (Plaid Cymru) and the Member of Parliament is Ben Lake (Plaid Cymru).

== See also ==
- List of localities in Wales by population
