= Trawscoed fort =

Trawscoed Fort
- Trawscoed shown within Ceredigion
- 52°20′0″N 3°56′0″W
- Location: Trawsgoed, Ceredigion, Wales

History
- Built: During the Iron Age

Site notes
- Architectural style: Castrum (Roman fort)

Scheduled monument
- Official name: Trawscoed Roman Fort
- Designated: 26 August 1959
- Reference no.: CD119

Schematic map of Roman roads and forts between Caerleon and west Wales dating to the later 1st century AD. Where the Roman names are known, these were identified through the Ravenna Cosmography (Note: The Ravenna Cosmography is a 7th century list of place names from the Roman World. In 1949 Richmond and Crawford published an article showing how British entries were ordered so as to follow routes along Roman roads, thus enabling a match with known places, in this case Roman forts along the road from Caerleon to west Wales.) (except for Luentinum and Moridunum which are mentioned in Ptolemy's Geographia).
Blue/black dots are listed in the Cosmography. Grey dots are other substantial forts known through archaeological remains.
1 Isca Augusta (Caerleon)
2 Gobannium, (Abergavenny)
3 Cicutio/Cicucium (Y Gaer, Brecon)
4 Alabum (Llanfair-ar-y-bryn, Llandovery)
5 Luentinum, (Pumsaint)
6 Bremia (Llanio, near Llanddewi Brefi)
7 Roman fort at Trawscoed
8 Roman Fort near Pen-llwyn
9 Dinefwr Park Roman forts, Llandeilo
10 Moridunum (Carmarthen)
11 Castell Collen (Llandrindod Wells)
12 Magnis (Kenchester), Herefordshire

Trawscoed fort is an auxiliary fort of Roman Britain in Ceredigion, Wales, near the modern settlement of Trawsgoed and is cut through by the modern B4340 road. It was first built in the 70s AD. and was occupied until around 130 AD, housing up to 800 infantry in rows of barracks within the 2.1 hectares (5.2 acres) banked enclosure. At its height it could have had a total population of around 2,000 people living at the fort and its extramural vicus. It overlooks the Roman bridge over the River Ystwyth, which is where the road from Pen-Ilwyn to Llanio crosses. In 1959, this site was initially identified via aerial photography revealing a series of parchmarks covering an area of around 20,000 square metres (2 ha). Later explorations increased the knowledge of this site.

== Description ==
This fort was 165 metres (541 ft) by 125 metres (410 ft) and stands on level ground 63 metres (207 ft) above sea level. It was surrounded by a ditch 3 metres (9.8 ft) wide and .9 metres (3.0 ft) deep. Inside this ditch was a clay and turf rampart which was 4.1 metres (13 ft) wide, and it had a clay and turf revetment. The rampart had a gate in each side, and its corners were rounded. Inside the fort, there were rows of barracks for up to 800 infantry. The commander's house, granaries, and headquarters were situated alongside the central range. There were also settlements and other ancillary features outside the walls and ditch. There is evidence that the whole settlement was built and rebuilt at least three times in all.

The fort is situated towards the north end of a string of such forts, built along a connecting road that led from the legionary fortress at Caerleon. The principle forts are spaced to be a day's march from their neighbour, allowing safe movement of troops across what would at least initially have been hostile territory.

== Initial exploration ==
Exploration of the northeastern portion of the fort revealed evidence of a large timber building. This evidence was the trench left by the remains of a wall running along the northwest–southeast axis. There were also two metal-clad post holes. Another building aligned in the same direction was beside the via decumana, evidenced by two wall trenches 7.8m apart and 6.8m long. A cobbled yard lay just to the east of this building. A clay oven was found in 1984 inside this building; however, this clay oven may not be contemporary with the building, and its location might just be a coincidence. This oven was sealed with clay after a fire was built during the Flavian dynasty. Further wall trenches were dug through the remains of this building, and they indicate the presence of a later building 8.5m long and 6.75m wide with a passageway on the eastern side. Two drains aligned on the northwest–southeast axis cut through this building. The occupation of this site occurred during 70 to 120 AD, with a period of abandonment around 100 AD.

== 21st century exploration ==
In November 2005, Trawscoed fort was explored using fluxgate gradiometer surveys by David Hopewell. The researchers surveyed a rectangle of 120 metres (390 ft) by 160 metres (520 ft), including the northern quadrant of the fort and the areas east and north of the fort. They collected the data by dividing this rectangle up into 20 metres (66 ft) by 20 metres (66 ft) square plots. They then surveyed each plot by walking along the length of the plot, taking readings every .5 metres (1.6 ft). Each scanned strip was 1 metre (3.3 ft) apart, giving a total of 800 readings per plot. The researchers then took this data and used Geoplot 3.0 software to generate X-Y waterfall plots and greyscale maps of the region. The waterfall plots were made by plotting each traversal of a plot on a trace, which enabled anomalies to be easily seen.

=== Interpretation of the results ===
High readings in the magnetic map were caused by pieces of iron and fences. Any locations where fire was, such as kilns and burning wooden structures, also increased the amount of magnetic response.

=== The results ===
David Hopewell reports that "The northern corner of the fort shows up clearly on the grey-scale plot", and sections of the ramparts showed evidence of burning. He found a ditch which circumscribed the fort just outside the walls. Just outside the ditch is a 10 metres (33 ft) wide swathe of ground containing very little magnetic response. To the northeast of this area he found a large, strong magnetic response which indicates that a bank once existed in this area. In the northern and eastern quadrants of the fort were blocks of six barracks each.

Hopewell also scanned some of the area around the fort, and he wrote that there was a road leading to the northeast gate. He recorded finding small anomalies on either side of the gate, which may indicate the presence of what was once a guard tower. Large areas of indications of burning imply that there may have been buildings that had burned down. The rest of the area to the northeast contains faint parallel striations in the magnetic map, which may indicate ploughing, followed by spots which may have been campfires. Jeffrey Davies' excavation trench, which he dug in 1974, caused a large line of static.

== Protecting the site ==
Until very recently, the fort was covered with gorse bushes. This plant has invasive roots, and scientists were worried that it might be damaging the remains of Trawscoed Fort. A group from FC Wales removed the gorse, and foresters laid down hay from the nearby Penrhyncoch meadow. The seeds contained in the hay will fall down and germinate, thus replacing the gorse with a layer of grass. This will have the added benefit of attracting birds and butterflies to the site.

== See also ==
- Scheduled monuments in Ceredigion
