= Ysgubor-y-coed =

Community in Ceredigion, Wales

- Community
- Principal area: Ceredigion
- Country: Wales
- Sovereign state: United Kingdom
- Police: Dyfed-Powys
- Fire: Mid and West Wales
- Ambulance: Welsh
- List of places UK Wales Ceredigion Community map: Map of the community

Ysgubor-y-coed is a community in the northernmost part of Ceredigion, Wales, with a population of 310 as of the 2011 UK census. It includes the villages of Eglwys Fach, Glandyfi, and Furnace. It is 12 miles (19 km) from Aberystwyth.

To the north and west are the south bank of the River Dyfi and its estuary, with an area of low-lying land. The river Einion flows through the Community. To the east are the Cambrian Mountains.

The remains of Aberdyfi castle (Tomen Las, a motte-and-bailey castle) are on the bank of the river Dyfi; it was built by Rhys ap Gruffudd in the 12th century. Also in the community is the RSPB's bird sanctuary at Ynys-hir.
