= Ceulanamaesmawr =

Community in Ceredigion, Wales

Coordinates: 52.4920°N 3.9942°W

- Location within Ceredigion
- Population: 1,013 (2011)
- OS grid reference: SN647901
  - Cardiff: 185 kilometres (115 mi)
- Principal area: Ceredigion
- Preserved county: Dyfed
- Country: Wales
- Sovereign state: United Kingdom
- Post town: Talybont
- Postcode district: SY24 5
- Police: Dyfed-Powys
- Fire: Mid and West Wales
- Ambulance: Welsh
- UK Parliament: Ceredigion Preseli
- Senedd Cymru – Welsh Parliament: Ceredigion Penfro
- List of places UK Wales Ceredigion Community map: Map of the community

Ceulanamaesmawr is a community in Ceredigion, Wales, consisting of Tal-y-bont, Bont-goch and the surrounding area. The total population at the United Kingdom Census 2011 was 1,013.

In addition to being a community, Ceulanamaesmawr is also an electoral ward.
