= Blaenrheidol =

Community in Ceredigion, Wales

Blaenrheidiol
- Location within Ceredigion
- Population: 495 (2011)
- Principal area: Ceredigion
- Preserved county: Dyfed
- Country: Wales
- Sovereign state: United Kingdom
- Post town: Aberystwyth
- Postcode district: SY23 3
- Police: Dyfed-Powys
- Fire: Mid and West Wales
- Ambulance: Welsh
- UK Parliament: Ceredigion Preseli
- Senedd Cymru – Welsh Parliament: Ceredigion Penfro
- List of places UK Wales Ceredigion 52.44039°N 3.81669°W Community map: Map of the community

Blaenrheidol is a community in the county of Ceredigion, North Wales. It lies in the Cambrian Mountains of Mid Wales, approximately 12 miles (19 km) east of Aberystwyth on the A44 road, and includes Pumlumon.

It includes the settlements of Ponterwyd, Ystumtuen and Llywernog. As the name suggests, a large section of the Afon Rheidol is in the community as well as the large man-made reservoir of Nant-y-moch.
