= Strata Florida Abbey =

Former Cistercian abbey in Ceredigion, Wales

- Abaty Ystrad Fflur
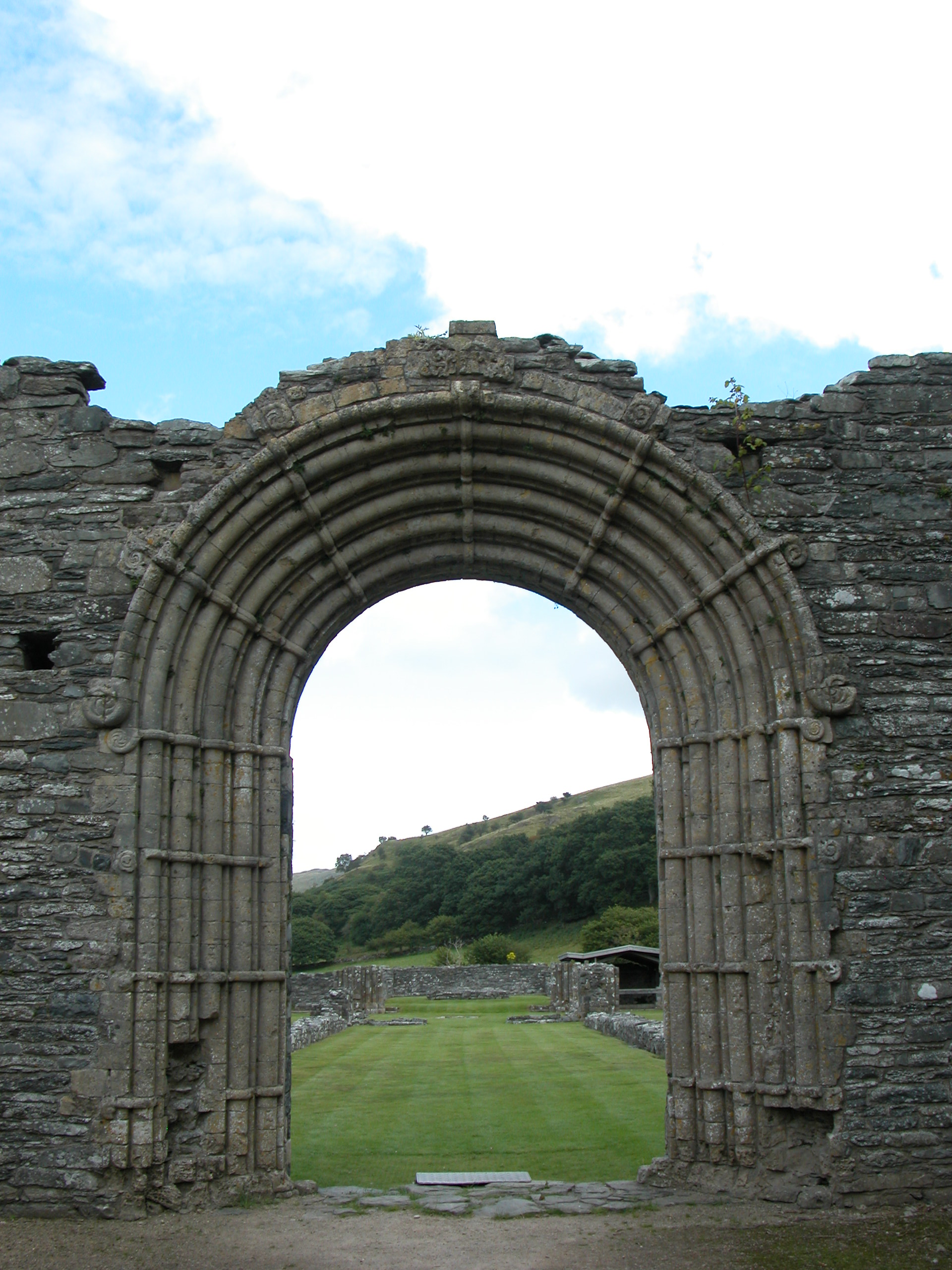
- Romanesque archway to the main nave at Strata Florida.

- Strata Florida within Wales

Religion
- Affiliation: Catholicism, Cistercians
- Year consecrated: 1201

Location
- Location: Pontrhydfendigaid, Ceredigion, Wales
- Coordinates: 52.275104°N 3.839376°W

Architecture
- Type: Monastery
- Style: Cistercian
- Funded by: Rhys ap Gruffydd
- Materials: Limestone

Website
- http://cadw.gov.wales/daysout/strata-florida-abbey/?lang=en

Strata Florida Abbey (Welsh: Abaty Ystrad Fflur;) is a former Cistercian abbey situated just outside Pontrhydfendigaid, near Tregaron in the county of Ceredigion, Wales. The abbey was founded in 1164. After the region around St Davids was firmly occupied by the Norman Marcher lordship of Pembroke by the early 12th century, with St Davids firmly under Norman influence thereafter, the princely Dinefwr family of Deheubarth transferred their patronage to Strata Florida, and interred many of their family members there.

== History ==
=== Foundation ===
The earliest copy of Rhys ap Gruffudd's 1184 charter from a roll commissioned by Edward I following his conquest of Wales

The Monastery was founded in 1164 by the Cambro-Norman Knight Robert FitzStephen (c 1123–1183). In the 12th century, Cistercian monks from Whitland Abbey, Narberth, Carmarthenshire started to construct a religious settlement on the banks of the Afon Fflur (from which the present Abbey takes its name), a short distance from the present site. This was at a time of fast expansion of the Cistercian order. The site of this first settlement is known as Hen Fynachlog (the Old Monastery).

In 1184, a further charter was issued by Rhys ap Gruffudd, reaffirming Strata Florida as a monastery under the patronage of Deheubarth, a principality of South Wales. Several descendants of the Lord Rhys have been buried at this Abbey, including 11 princes of the Welsh royal house of Dinefwr of Deheubarth during the 12th and 13th centuries. Notable burials include Prince Gruffydd ap Rhys II and poet Dafydd ap Gwilym.

In 1188, archbishop Baldwin's tour of Wales was accompanied by Seisyll, the abbot of Strata Florida. When the tour reached the abbey paused for a time to "repose" themselves. Lewis Thorpe assumes they remained there for three days.

The church was consecrated in 1201.

=== Medieval period ===
The patent rolls for the reign of King John record that in 1212 he ordered Falkes de Bréauté to destroy the abbey. The abbey paid a fine of 700 marks to avert the destruction.

Strata Florida became an important and powerful religious centre. Around 1238, Prince Llywelyn ap Iorwerth held a council at Strata Florida. It was here that he made the other Welsh leaders acknowledge his son Dafydd as his rightful successor. Strata Florida controlled many farms throughout Wales; these "granges" provided the monastery with food and income. The most important primary historical source for early Welsh history, the Brut y Tywysogion, was compiled at Strata Florida.

In 1401, during the early years of Owain Glyndŵr's rebellion, Strata Florida Abbey was taken by King Henry IV and his son. The monks were deemed to be sympathetic to Glyndŵr, so they were evicted from the monastery, which was plundered. Henry IV turned the religious buildings into a military base as he planned to capture or defeat any Welsh rebel forces active in the area. By 1402 the Earl of Worcester held the Abbey for the English Crown with a garrison of several hundred men-at-arms, archers and foot soldiers. It continued to be used as a military base for further campaigns against the Welsh rebels in 1407 and 1415.

The monastic site was returned to the Cistercians with the end of the Glyndŵr rebellion.

=== Dissolution ===
Beginning in 1539, Henry VIII used his dissatisfaction with the Catholic Church in Rome to dissolve and sack the monasteries of England and Wales. Strata Florida Abbey was dissolved in 1539 by church commissioners. The buildings and their contents were valued and then sold off. The church and most of the ancillary buildings were demolished for building materials such as the window glass and stone as well as the roof tiles and lead. However, the refectory and dormitory were rebuilt as Tŷ Abaty, a house for the local gentry. The property has been owned by a number of notable families including the Stedmans and the Powells of Nanteos. Much of the former monastic lands of the Cistercian abbey at Strata Florida were given to Thomas Cromwell, 1st Earl of Essex who sold them on to Sir John Vaughan, of Trawsgoed. Through his marriage to Jane Stedman, daughter of John Stedman of Ystrad Fflur and Cilcennin, he gained more land on which to create the large Trawsgoed estate.

The present parish church of St. Mary, within the boundaries of the graveyard, may have been built with stone taken from the monastic site.

== Abandonment ==
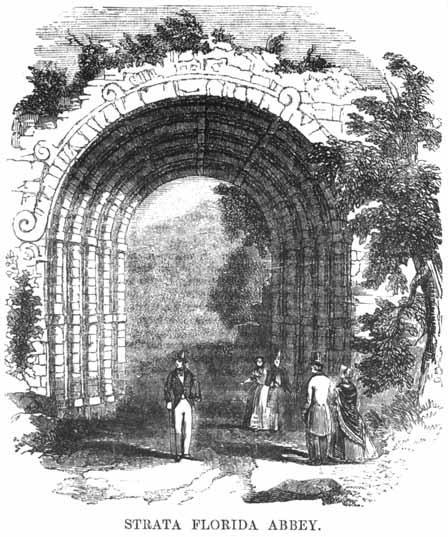
The remains of Strata Florida Abbey as depicted in the 1851 Illustrated London Reading Book

Following its dissolution, the site of Strata Florida Abbey was left to deteriorate. It was not until the coming of the railways in the late 19th century that interest in the site was rekindled. Stephen Williams, a railway engineer, was surveying a possible route through the area when he took an interest in the ruins. As Williams was a founder member of the Cambrian Archaeological Association, he invited the group to the site in 1848. Following this visit the Association leased the Abbey site in order to create better displays and presentations to the public.

Williams, who was to become a leading expert on the archaeology of the Cistercian Order, was placed in charge of excavations. Over the next few years, he removed huge amounts of spoil, to uncover the majority of remains that are still on view today. Interest in the ruins brought in wealthy Victorians by railway. Strata Florida, a principal station on the Carmarthen Aberystwyth Line, was named after the Abbey.

About the Abbey the 1851 Illustrated London Reading Book says:

The remains of Strata Florida Abbey, in South Wales, are most interesting in many points of view, more especially as the relics of a stately seminary for learning, founded as early as 1164. The community of the Abbey were Cistercian monks, who soon attained great celebrity, and acquired extensive possessions. They founded a large library that included national records from the earliest periods, works of the bards, and genealogies of the Princes and great families in Wales. The monks also compiled a valuable history of the Principality, down to the death of Llewellyn the Great. When Edward I invaded Wales, he burned the Abbey, but it was rebuilt A.D. 1294.

Extensive woods once flourished in the vicinity of Strata Florida, and its burial-place covered no less than 120 acres (0.49 km^{2}). A long list of eminent persons from all parts of Wales were buried, and amongst them Dafydd ap Gwilym, the famous bard. The churchyard is now reduced to small dimensions; but leaden coffins, doubtless belonging to once celebrated personages, are still found, both there and at a distance from the cemetery. Only a few aged box and yew-trees now remain to tell of the luxuriant verdure that once grew around the Abbey. Of the venerable pile itself, little is left, except an arch, and the fragment of a fine old wall, about forty feet high. A small church now stands within the enclosure, more than commonly interesting from having been built with the materials of the once celebrated Abbey of Strata Florida.

== Preservation ==
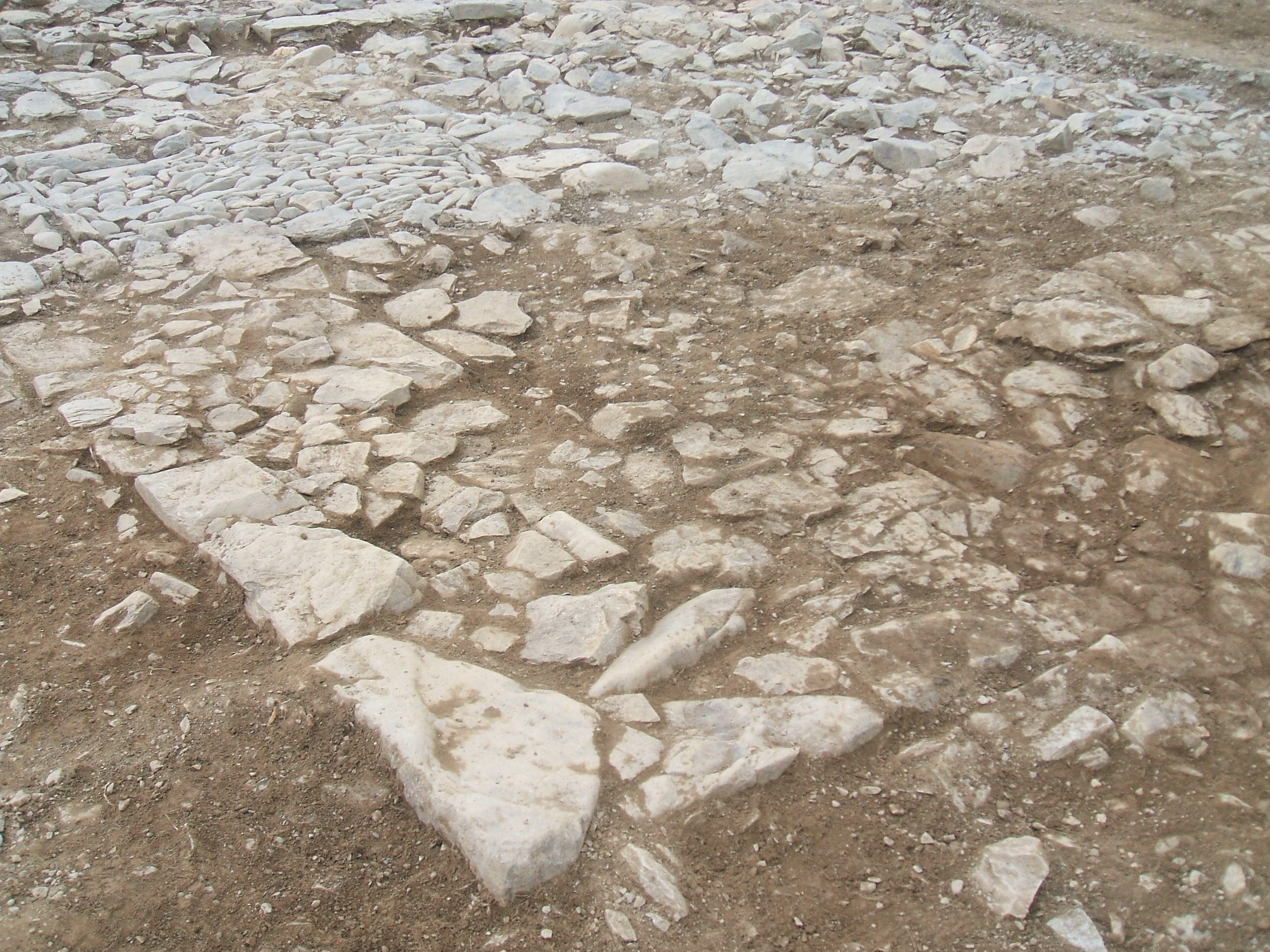
Excavation of the 'gatehouse' 2008

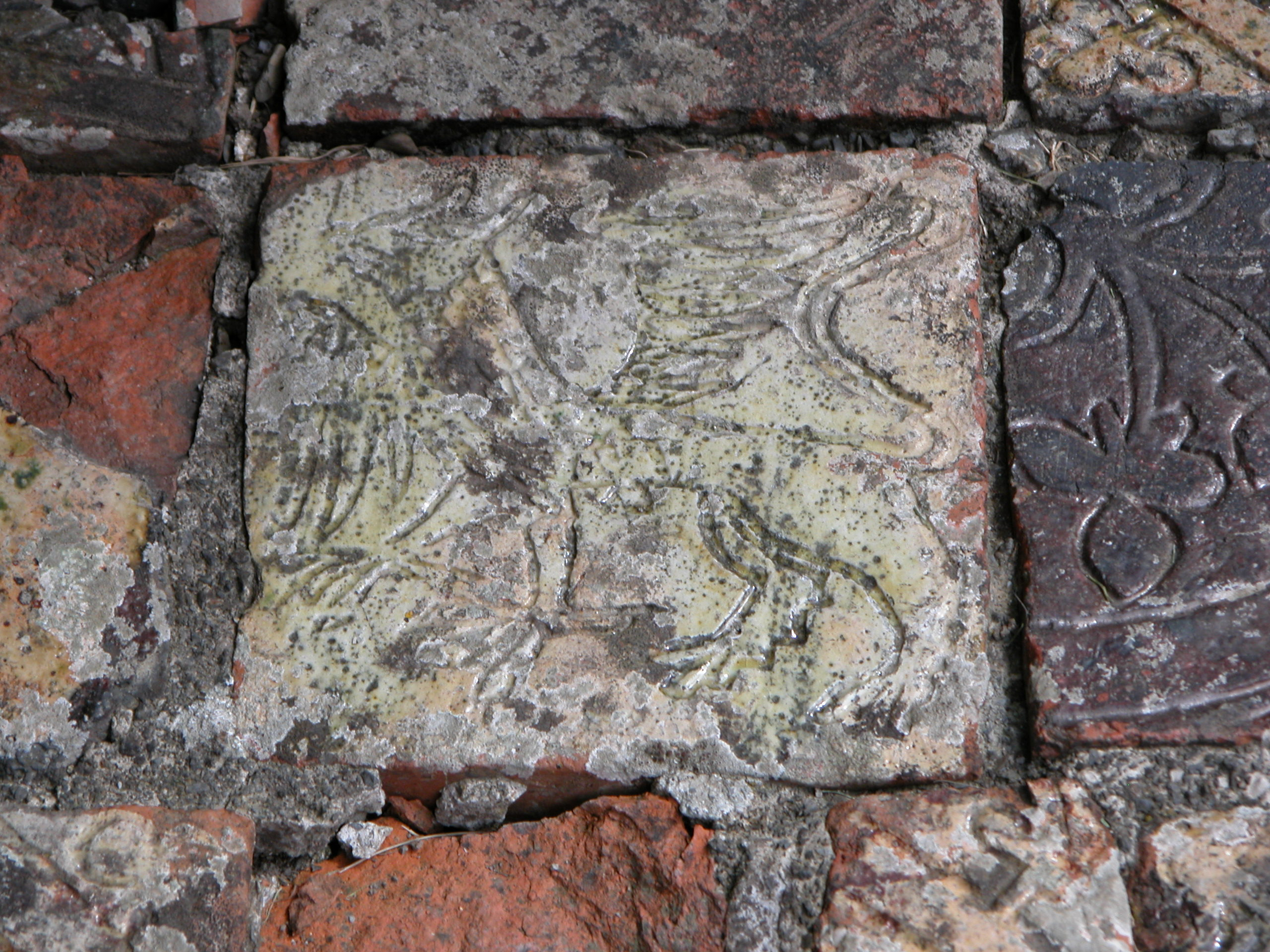
An excavated mediaeval floor tile.

The site was designated as a Scheduled Ancient Monument in 1919 and is now in the care of Cadw. It has a variety of ruins. The only substantive structure remaining of the monastery is the main entrance archway. The Great West Door to the Abbey Church has low walls marking the extent of the church and its six subsidiary chapels. A modern roof protects an area of excavated work medieval tiling. The small on-site museum has some of these tiles on display. One of the best-known is one depicting a medieval gentleman admiring himself in a mirror.

The graveyard next to the Abbey ruins is still used for burials. A memorial to the Welsh language poet, Dafydd ap Gwilym, who is interred here is next to an ancient yew tree. A stone memorial in the Chapter House commemorates the princes who are buried at Strata Florida. It is a replica; the original is housed in the site's small museum.

=== Archaeological research ===
Geophysical surveys by the University of Wales, Lampeter, and its successor University of Wales, Trinity Saint David, have found several large structures. These include what is thought to be possibly the gatehouse to the Abbey's inner precincts. There is no definitive evidence for a kiln that made tiles for the Abbey to be found in the surrounding woods.

Excavations of the possible gatehouse have revealed a number of medieval pottery tile sherds, indicating that the building may have also housed a chapel, possibly over the entrance way. The building was later reused as a residence and possibly as agricultural buildings. At some point a substantial frontage was built over the original gateway road to create space between the two flanking buildings. The structure then fell into disrepair and was lost.

A number of field boundaries have also been identified. Two leats that may have increased water flow into the Nant Glasffrwd were studied. It is believed they were used to run a mill further downstream. Iron working slag was discovered within the monastic precincts. As of November 2019, the excavations at Strata Florida are ongoing.

== See also ==
- List of monastic houses in Wales
- List of Roman-to-modern scheduled monuments in Ceredigion
- Desert of Wales
