= Ystumtuen =

Village in Ceredigion, Wales

Coordinates: 52.39122°N 3.86007°W

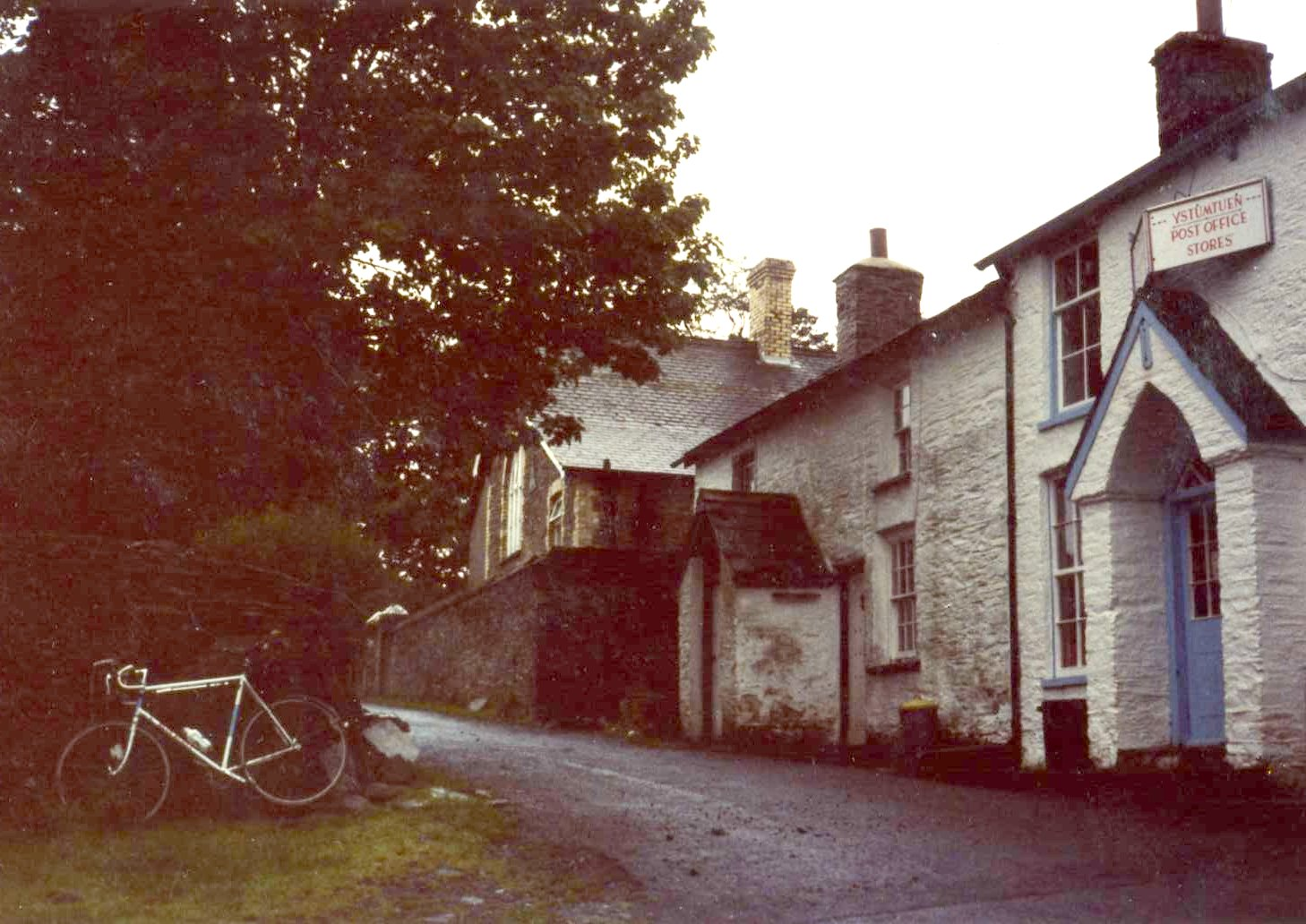
Post Office and youth hostel

Ystumtuen is a small village in northern Ceredigion, Wales. It is situated above the valley of the River Rheidol.

It is situated on rocks rich in lead and silver and during a lengthy period in the 18th and 19th centuries, Ystumtuen was a bustling mining village. With the demise of the lead mining industry and in particular the closure of Cwm Rheidol mine, the population dwindled rapidly with the last ancestral population disappearing in the 1970s. This may in part have been due to the high lead content of the local spring sources. The village was re-populated for a time in the 1970s by hippy communities, and in recent years the population has been steadily increasing.

There was a Youth Hostel run by the Youth Hostel Association in the old school, but this has now closed. The YHA sign was still there in 2021.
