= Ystrad Fflur =

Village and community in Ceredigion, Wales

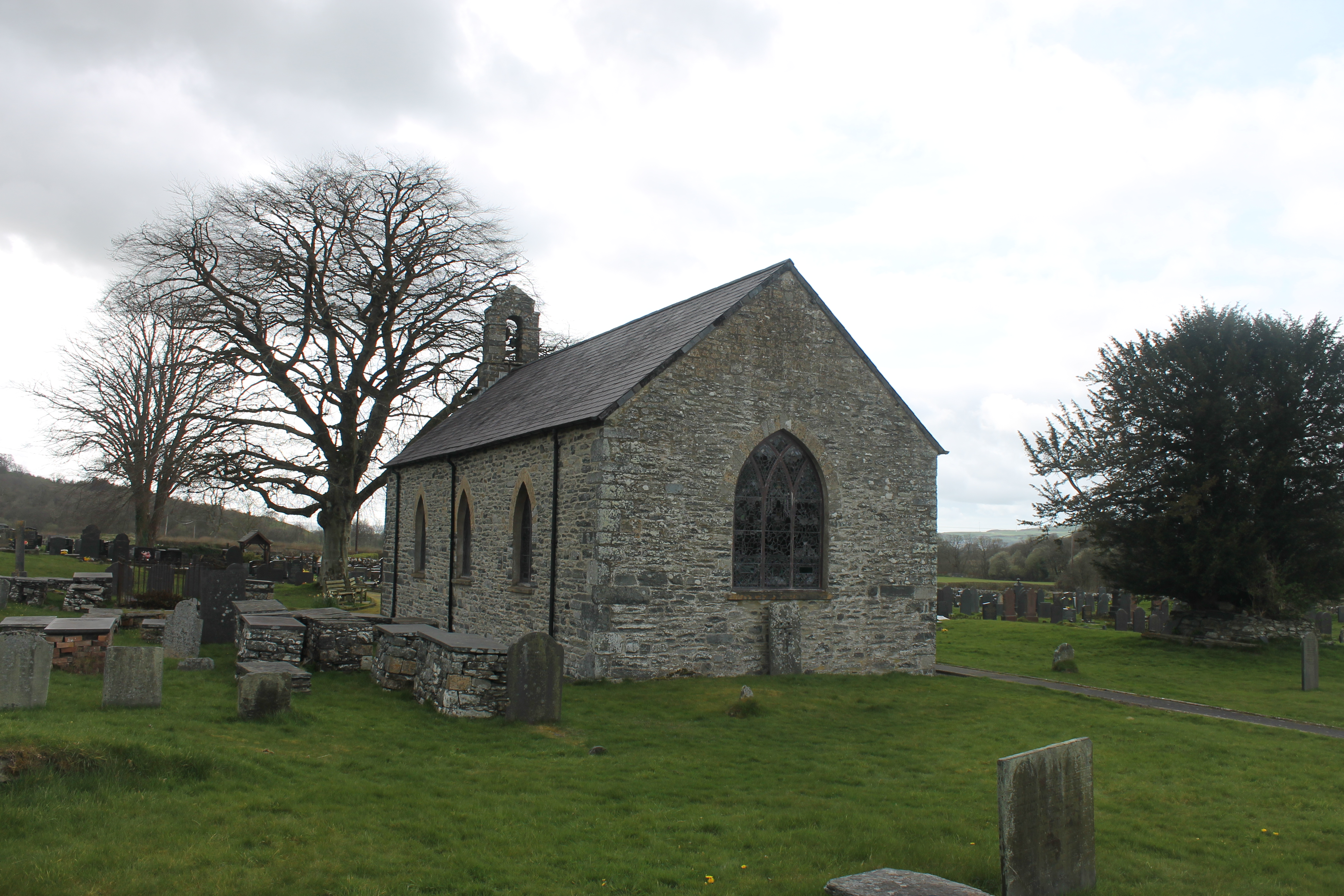
- Church of St Mary

- Location within Ceredigion
- Population: 712 (2011)
- OS grid reference: SN 747 656
  - Cardiff: 61.7 mi (99.3 km)
  - London: 166.8 mi (268.4 km)
- Community: Ystrad Fflur (community)
- Principal area: Ceredigion
- Country: Wales
- Sovereign state: United Kingdom
- Post town: Tregaron
- Postcode district: SY25
- Police: Dyfed-Powys
- Fire: Mid and West Wales
- Ambulance: Welsh
- UK Parliament: Ceredigion Preseli
- Senedd Cymru – Welsh Parliament: Ceredigion Penfro
- List of places UK Wales Ceredigion 52.274381°N 3.837863°W Community map: Map of the community

Ystrad Fflur (Welsh for 'valley of flowers') is a hamlet and community in Ceredigion, Wales, south-east of Aberystwyth. The community includes the villages of Pontrhydfendigaid and Ffair Rhos. Strata Florida Abbey is located in the vicinity.

Ystrad Fflur is part of the Ceredigion constituency, represented as of 2025 in the Senedd by Elin Jones and in the House of Commons by Ben Lake, both of Plaid Cymru.

== See also ==
- Strata Florida Abbey
- List of localities in Wales by population
