= Dyffryn Arth =

Community in Ceredigion, Wales

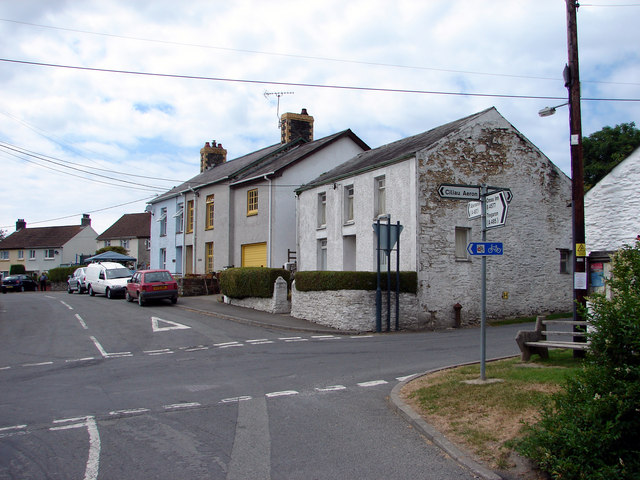

- Location within Ceredigion
- Population: 1,174
- OS grid reference: SN 5410 6284
  - Cardiff: 66.8 mi (107.5 km)
  - London: 178.4 mi (287.1 km)
- Community: Dyffryn Arth
- Principal area: Ceredigion
- Country: Wales
- Sovereign state: United Kingdom
- Post town: ABERAERON
- Postcode district: SA46
- Post town: LLANON
- Postcode district: SY23
- Police: Dyfed-Powys
- Fire: Mid and West Wales
- Ambulance: Welsh
- UK Parliament: Ceredigion Preseli
- List of places UK Wales Ceredigion 52°14′40″N 4°08′18″W Community map: Map of the community

Dyffryn Arth is a community in the county of Ceredigion, Wales, and is 66.8 miles (107.5 km) from Cardiff and 178.4 miles (287.1 km) from London. In 2011 the population of Dyffryn Arth was 1174 with 49.7% of them able to speak Welsh. It includes the villages of Aberarth, Pennant, Moelfryn, and Cross Inn, as well as the hamlet Pontrhyd-Saeson.

== See also ==
- List of localities in Wales by population
