= List of places in Ceredigion =

Map of places in Ceredigion compiled from this list
See the list of places in Wales for places in other principal areas.

This is a list of towns and villages in the county of Ceredigion, Wales.

== A ==
- Aber
- Aberaeron
- Aberarth
- Aberffrwd
- Aber-meurig
- Abermagwr
- Aberporth
- Aberystwyth
- Alltyblacca

== B ==
- Banc-y-môr
- Bethania
- Betws Bledrws
- Betws Ifan
- Beulah
- Blaenplwyf
- Blaenporth
- Borth
- Bow Street
- Bronant
- Brongest
- Brynhoffnant
- Bwlchllan

== C ==
- Caerwedros
- Cei Bach
- Capel Bangor
- Capel Betws Leuci
- Capel Dewi, Aberystwyth
- Capel Dewi, Llandysul
- Capel Seion
- Cardigan
- Cellan
- Cenarth
- Ciliau Aeron
- Chancery
- Commin Capel Betws
- Comins Coch
- Cribyn
- Cross Inn, Llan-non
- Cross Inn, Cei Newydd/New Quay
- Cwmbrwyno
- Cwmerfyn
- Cwm Rheidol
- Cwmsychbant
- Cwmsymlog
- Cwmtudu
- Cwm Ystwyth
- Cwrtnewydd

== D ==
- Devil's Bridge
- Dihewyd
- Dole
- Drefach

== E ==
- Elerech

== F ==
- Felin Fach
- Y Ferwig
- Ffaldybrenin
- Ffair Rhos
- Ffoshelyg
- Ffostrasol
- Ffosyffin
- Furnace

== G ==
- Gilfachreda
- Glan-y-môr
- Glynarthen
- Goginan
- Gors Goch
- Gwbert

== H ==
- Henllan
- Horeb

== L ==
- Lampeter
- Llanarth
- Llanbadarn Fawr
- Llanddeiniol
- Llandysul
- Llanfair Clydogau
- Llanfihangel y Creuddyn
- Llangorwen
- Llangranog
- Llangwyryfon
- Llangubi
- Llanilar
- Llanon
- Llanrhystud
- Llansantffraid
- Llanddewi Brefi
- Llanwenog
- Llanwnnen
- Llanybydder
- Llechryd
- Llwyncelyn

== M ==
- Monachty
- Moriah
- Mwnt
- Mydroilyn

== N ==
- Nanternis
- Newcastle Emlyn
- New Quay

== O ==
- Oakford

== P ==
- Penbryn
- Pen-y-wenallt
- Penrhyn-coch
- Pentregat
- Penparc
- Penparcau
- Penuwch
- Pen-y-garn
- Pisgah
- Plwmp
- Pont rhyd y groes
- Pontrhydfendigaid
- Pontsian
- Post-bach
- Post-mawr

== R ==
- Rhydfelin
- Rhydlewis
- Rhydowen
- Rhyd Rosser
- Rhydypennau

== S ==
- Sarnau
- Silian
- Strata Florida
- Synod Inn

== T ==
- Talgarreg
- Tal-y-bont
- Tan-y-groes
- Temple Bar
- Trawsgoed
- Trefenter
- Tregaron
- Tremain
- Tresaith
- Troed y Rhiw

== V ==
- Velindre

== W ==
- Wallog

== Y ==
- Ysbyty Ystwyth
- Ystrad Aeron
- Ystrad Ffin
- Ystrad Meurig
- Ystumtuen

== Categorised by Administrative Divisions ==
=== Electoral wards ===
This is a list of electoral wards:

- Aberaeron
- Aberporth
- Aberystwyth Bronglais
- Aberystwyth Central
- Aberystwyth North
- Aberystwyth Penparcau
- Aberystwyth Rheidol
- Beulah
- Borth
- Capel Dewi
- Cardigan Mwldan
- Cardigan Rhydyfuwch
- Cardigan Teifi
- Ceulan-a-maesmawr
- Ciliau Aeron
- Faenor
- Lampeter
- Llanarth
- Llanbadarn Fawr Padarn
- Llanbadarn Fawr Sulien
- Llandyfriog
- Llandysiliogogo
- Llandysul Town
- Llanfarian
- Llanfihangel Ystrad
- Llangeitho
- Llangybi
- Llanrhystud
- Llansantffraid
- Llanwenog
- Lledrod
- Melindwr
- New Quay
- Penbryn
- Penparc
- Tirymynach
- Trefeurig
- Tregaron
- Troedyraur
- Ystwyth

=== Communities ===
This is a list of communities:

- Aberaeron
- Aberporth
- Aberystwyth
- Beulah
- Blaenrheidol
- Borth
- Cardigan
- Ceulan-a-maesmawr
- Ciliau Aeron
- Dyffryn Arth
- Faenor
- Geneu'r Glyn
- Henfynyw
- Lampeter
- Llanarth
- Llanbadarn Fawr
- Llanddewi Brefi
- Llandyfriog
- Llandysiliogogo
- Llandysul
- Llanfair Clydogau
- Llanfarian
- Llanfihangel Ystrad
- Llangeitho
- Llangoedmor
- Llangrannog
- Llangwyryfon
- Llangybi
- Llangynfelyn
- Llanilar
- Llanrhystud
- Llansantffraed
- Llanwenog
- Llanwnnen
- Lledrod
- Melindwr
- Nantcwnlle
- New Quay
- Penbryn
- Pontarfynach
- Tirymynach
- Trawsgoed
- Trefeurig
- Tregaron
- Troedyraur
- Y Ferwig
- Ysbyty Ystwyth
- Ysgubor-y-coed
- Ystrad Fflur
- Ystrad Meurig

== See also ==
- List of places in Wales
