= James Evans =

James, Jim, or Jimmy Evans may refer to:

== In sport ==
- James Evans (cricketer) (1891–1973), English cricketer
- James Evans (rugby league) (born 1978), Australian rugby player
- James Evans (running back) (1963–2015), American football player in the NFL
- Jim Evans (rugby union) (born 1980), English rugby player
- Jim Evans (rugby league) (1929–2013), Australian rugby player
- Jim Evans (wide receiver) (born 1939), American football player in the AFL
- Jim Evans (umpire) (born 1946), American baseball umpire
- Jimmy Evans (footballer, born 1894) (1894–1975), Welsh international defender
- Jimmy Evans (footballer, born 1999), Nigerian midfielder

== In politics ==
- James L. Evans (1825–1903), American politician from Indiana
- James Evans (Ontario politician) (1821–1880), Canadian politician
- Edgar James Evans (fl. 1919–1923), Canadian politician in Ontario
- James Evans (Minnesota politician) (1927–2012), American politician
- James Evans (Mississippi politician) (born 1950), American politician
- James Evans (Utah politician) (born 1962), American politician, Utah Republican chair
- James Evans (Welsh politician), Welsh politician, member of the Senedd
- Jimmy Evans (politician) (1939–2021), American lawyer and politician

== Others ==
- James Evans (linguist) (1801–1846), English-Canadian missionary and writing system creator
- James A. Evans (1827–1887), British-American civil engineer (1863–1869)
- James R. Evans (1845–1918), American Civil War soldier and Medal of Honor recipient
- James Guy Evans (1809–1859), American marine artist
- Jim Evans (artist) (born 1950s), American album, comic and poster artist
- James H. Evans (born 1954), American photographer
- James D. Evans, president of Lindenwood University, Missouri, US
- James Evans (historian) (born 1975), English historian and documentary maker
- James Harington Evans (1785–1849), English Anglican cleric
- James Allan Stewart Evans (1931–2023), Canadian historian

== In fiction ==
- James Evans, Sr. and J.J. Evans, characters on 1970s American TV sitcom Good Times
