= Llanbadarn Fawr Community Council =

Local council in Ceredigion, Wales

Type
- Type: Community council

Leadership
- Chairman: Councillor Martin Davies
- Vice Chairman: Councillor Linda Keeler

Structure
- Seats: 15
- Political groups: Independents (8); Plaid Cymru (5); Labour (1); Liberal Democrats (1)

Elections
- Last election: 4 May 2017
- Next election: 5 May 2022

Meeting place
- Soar Chapel, Primrose Hill, Llanbadarn Fawr, Aberystwyth

Website
- Llanbadarn Fawr Community Council website

Llanbadarn Fawr Community Council (Welsh: Cyngor Cymuned Llanbadarn Fawr) is the community council that administers the community of Llanbadarn Fawr.

The council elects fifteen representatives from two wards: Llanbadarn Fawr - Sulien (9) and Llanbadarn Fawr - Padarn (6).

At its annual meeting, held in May each year, the council appoints a Chairman and Vice Chairman. The current Chairman is Councillor Martin Davies (Independent).

Clockwise, from the north, it borders the communities of Y Faenor, Llanfarian and Aberystwyth.

== Election history ==
Elections to Llanbadarn Fawr Community Council take place at the same time as other local government elections in Wales.

=== 2022 Election ===
The last elections were held on 5 May 2022. As there were fewer candidates than seats, the councillors were elected without contest. The election resulted in 8 seats for independent councillors, 2 seats for Plaid Cymru, and 5 vacant seats.

Ward	Party	Candidates
Llanbadarn Fawr - Sulien	Plaid Cymru	Carolyn Hodges
Llanbadarn Fawr - Sulien	Independent	Mary Roseann Daniel
Llanbadarn Fawr - Sulien	Independent	Benjamin Lewis Davies
Llanbadarn Fawr - Sulien	Independent	David Martin James Davies
Llanbadarn Fawr - Sulien	Independent	David Greaney
Llanbadarn Fawr - Sulien	Independent	Linda Mary Keeler
Llanbadarn Fawr - Sulien	Independent	Thomas James Kendall
Llanbadarn Fawr - Sulien	Independent	Andrew Graham Loat
Llanbadarn Fawr - Sulien	Independent	David Graham Pain
Llanbadarn Fawr - Padarn	Plaid Cymru	Gareth Davies
Llanbadarn Fawr - Padarn	N/A	vacant seat
Llanbadarn Fawr - Padarn	N/A	vacant seat
Llanbadarn Fawr - Padarn	N/A	vacant seat
Llanbadarn Fawr - Padarn	N/A	vacant seat
Llanbadarn Fawr - Padarn	N/A	vacant seat

=== 2017 election ===
The 2017 elections were held on 3 May 2017. As there were fewer candidates than seats, the councillors were elected without contest.

Ward	Party	Candidates
Llanbadarn Fawr - Sulien	Independent	David Greaney
Llanbadarn Fawr - Sulien	Plaid Cymru	Paul James
Llanbadarn Fawr - Sulien	Independent	Linda Mary Keeler
Llanbadarn Fawr - Sulien	Plaid Cymru	Dafydd John Pritchard
Llanbadarn Fawr - Sulien	Plaid Cymru	Siôn Tomos Jobbins
Llanbadarn Fawr - Padarn	Independent	Benjamin Lewis Davies
Llanbadarn Fawr - Padarn	Independent	David Martin James Davies
Llanbadarn Fawr - Padarn	Plaid Cymru	Gareth Davies
Llanbadarn Fawr - Padarn	Liberal Democrats	Ada Margaret Leney
Llanbadarn Fawr - Padarn	Plaid Cymru	Stepanie Mary Lennon

As not all seats were filled at the 2017 election, Siôn Jobbins was voted to be coopted y the council.

=== 2012 election ===
The 2012 elections were held on 3 May and resulted in Uncontested Elections for all fifteen members.

Ward	Party	Candidates
Llanbadarn Fawr - Sulien	Plaid Cymru	David Greaney
Llanbadarn Fawr - Sulien	Plaid Cymru	Mark Hemingway
Llanbadarn Fawr - Sulien	Plaid Cymru	Paul James
Llanbadarn Fawr - Sulien	Plaid Cymru	Stephanie Lennon
Llanbadarn Fawr - Sulien	Plaid Cymru	Dafydd John Pritchard
Llanbadarn Fawr - Sulien	Independent	Gwern Gwynfil Evans
Llanbadarn Fawr - Sulien	Independent	Linda Mary Keeler
Llanbadarn Fawr - Sulien	Independent	Paul Thomas
Llanbadarn Fawr - Padarn	Independent	Benjamin Lewis Davies
Llanbadarn Fawr - Padarn	Independent	Sarah Mary Jones
Llanbadarn Fawr - Padarn	Independent	D Martin J davies
Llanbadarn Fawr - Padarn	Plaid Cymru	Gareth Davies
Llanbadarn Fawr - Padarn	Plaid Cymru	Ursula Byrne
Llanbadarn Fawr - Padarn	Liberal Democrats	Margaret Lenney

As there were two vacancies, one for each ward, the council voted to co-opt two independent members:David Greaney and Martin Davies (who had previously served as a councillor).
