= Troed =

Troed may refer to the following places in Wales:

- Troed y Rhiw, hamlet in Ceredigion
- Troed-y-rhiw, village in Merthyr Tydfil
- Troed-yr-hen-riw, hamlet in the community of Blaenrheidol, Ceredigion
