= Glan-yr-afon =

Glan-yr-afon, Glanyrafon and Glanrafon may refer to:

- Glan-yr-afon, Bodffordd, Anglesey, Wales
- Glan-yr-afon, Llangoed, Anglesey, Wales
- Glanyrafon, Ceredigion, Wales
  - Glanyrafon railway station
- Glan-yr-afon, Flintshire, Wales
- Glan-yr-afon, Gwynedd, Wales
- Glan-yr-Afon Halt railway station (former), Powys, Wales
- Glan-yr-afon, Shropshire, England
  - Glanyrafon Halt railway station (former)
- Riverside, Cardiff, Wales

== See also ==
- Glanafon, Pembrokeshire, Wales
