= Pont y Gilfach =

Village in Ceredigion, Wales

Coordinates: 52.226332°N 4.290166°W

- Location within Ceredigion
- OS grid reference: SN 4367 6115
  - Cardiff: 70.1 mi (112.8 km)
  - London: 184.4 mi (296.8 km)
- Community: Henfynyw
- Principal area: Ceredigion
- Country: Wales
- Sovereign state: United Kingdom
- Post town: Aberaeron
- Postcode district: SA46
- Police: Dyfed-Powys
- Fire: Mid and West Wales
- Ambulance: Welsh
- UK Parliament: Ceredigion Preseli
- Senedd Cymru – Welsh Parliament: Ceredigion Penfro

Pont y Gilfach (or Pont-y-Gilfach) is a small village in the community of Henfynyw, Ceredigion, Wales, which is 70.1 miles (112.8 km) from Cardiff and 184.4 miles (296.7 km) from London. Pont y Gilfach is represented in the Senedd by Elin Jones (Plaid Cymru) and is part of the Ceredigion Preseli constituency in the House of Commons.

== See also ==
- List of localities in Wales by population
