= Faenor =

Faenor may refer to:

Places

- Faenor, Ceredigion, Wales
- Y Faenor, the Welsh name for Vaynor in Merthyr Tydfil, Wales

Not to be confused with

- Fëanor, a fictional character by JRR Tolkien
