= Cyfaill Deoniaeth Llanbadarn Fawr =

19th-century monthly Welsh-language magazine

Cyfaill Deoniaeth Llanbadarn Fawr was a 19th-century monthly Welsh language magazine, published in Carmarthen by W. Spurrell and Son printers for the established Church in the Deanery of Llanbadarn Fawr.

It contained mainly local news from the deanery's parishes, with 'Cyfaill Egwlysig' included as an insert. The magazine's editors included John Thomas Griffiths, Daniel Arthur Thomas, and Hywel Meredith Williams.
