= Cribyn =

Village in Ceredigion, Wales

Coordinates: 52.139°N 4.162°W

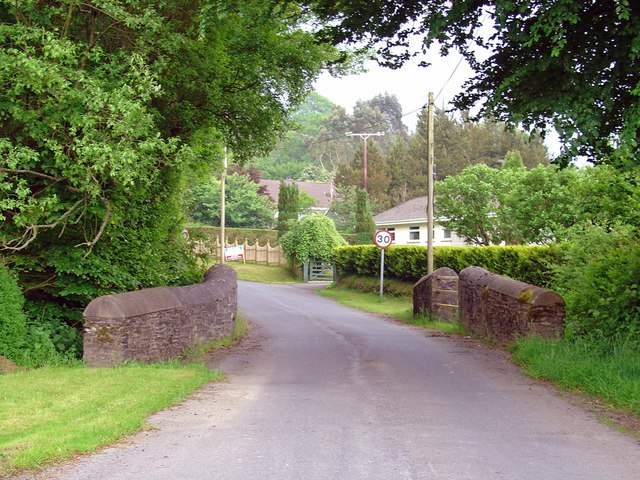
- Small bridge over Nant Fudr-fach, Cribyn, Ceredigion

- Location within Ceredigion
- OS grid reference: SN521511
  - Cardiff: 90 mi (140 km)SE
- Principal area: Ceredigion
- Preserved county: Dyfed
- Country: Wales
- Sovereign state: United Kingdom
- Post town: Lampeter
- Postcode district: SA48
- Dialling code: 01570
- Police: Dyfed-Powys
- Fire: Mid and West Wales
- Ambulance: Welsh
- UK Parliament: Ceredigion Preseli
- Senedd Cymru – Welsh Parliament: Ceredigion Penfro

Cribyn is a small village in Ceredigion, Wales, about 7 miles (11 km) north of Lampeter and with the villages of Troed y Rhiw, Mydroilyn and Dihewyd to the north.

== History and amenities ==
Once a thriving community with two pubs, a garage and a post office, it is now largely reduced to a dormitory town or commuter village for Lampeter.

The primary school in the village, founded by local hero Gwilym Butler-Wilkins, has maintained its status as primarily Welsh speaking since its establishment in 1876.

Cribyn has one of the few Unitarian chapels in Ceredigion, which was established in 1790 by Dafydd Davis Castellhywel and Evan Davies, Cwmbedw. There was an old cottage next to the Nonconformist chapel which was older than the chapel, and a school was held here for many years until the primary school was founded.

Four parishes meet in Cribyn, and most parishioners went to the parish church in Llanfihangel Ystrad until the present church was established at the end of the 19th century.

Capel Sant Silin on the road from Cribyn to Gorsgoch is the oldest part of the village. Saint Silin built a small church here in the 6th or 7th century. A horse fair was held here until the 1930s and the village used to come to a standstill when the fair was on. A small stone-built building on the corner by Penlancapel was used as a kitchen during the fair and food was sold from here. Penlancapel is the oldest dwelling in the village apart from the old corn mill. Felin Hafodwen was part of the estate of the abbey at Ystrad Ceilliau, Strata Florida Abbey. It was still milling corn in the twentieth century.

On the road to Mydroilyn, there was a woollen mill and the cottage near the coarse fishing ponds was the fuller's cottage, Pandy.

Opposite the school, on the road to Temple Bar, is Cae Hir. The farmhouse and outbuildings were one long row with a passage separating the living quarters from the livestock. These days it is the reception area for Cae Hir Gardens and Tea Room.

On 8 July 1944, late in the evening, Cribyn School received a group of about 10 or so evacuees from London who had previously been transported from Paddington Station in London to Lampeter railway station. This operation was part of a renewed government exercise of evacuating children because of the onset of the German V1 bombing campaign begun shortly before. At Lampeter the evacuees were received at the local grammar school for refreshments and distribution to buses for delivery to local villages. Facing them at the Cribyn school was a group of local residents who then made their choices, although unfortunately (probably understandable given the stresses and tiredness of the day) some of the children began to cry. This writer was one of the group, but did not join in the crying, and stayed in a large house just outside the village until June 1945. This writer is still in contact with one of the school 'girls'. It was an experience he has never forgotten.
