= Claire Archibald =

Welsh politician (born July 1973)

Claire Archibald MS
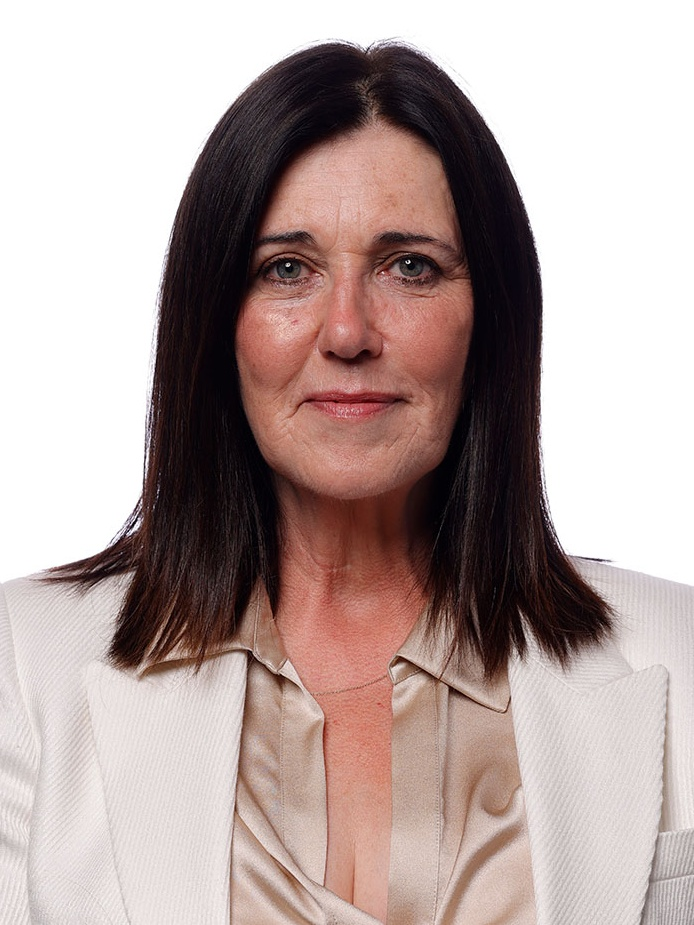
- Official portrait, 2026

Shadow Minister for Social Care
- Incumbent
- Assumed office 19 May 2026
- Leader: Dan Thomas; Helen Jenner
- Preceded by: James Evans

Member of the Senedd
- Incumbent
- Assumed office 8 May 2026
- Constituency: Ceredigion Penfro

Personal details
- Born: Susan Claire Archibald Pembroke, Pembrokeshire
- Party: Reform UK Wales
- Children: 3
- Website: clairearchibaldms.co.uk

Susan Claire Archibald (born July 1973) is a Welsh politician who has served as Shadow Minister for Social Care and as member of the Senedd (MS) for Ceredigion Penfro since May 2026.

== Early life and career ==
Archibald was born in Pembroke, Pembrokeshire, Wales. She has previously worked in health care and is trained in palliative care.

== Political career ==
In the 2026 Senedd election, Archibald was elected as a Member of the Senedd (MS) for the six-member Ceredigion Penfro constituency, with the party receiving 23,003 votes (25.8%). She was Reform UK Wales' lead candidate for the constituency. Prior to the election, she served as a member of Pembroke Town Council for the Monkton ward.

Following the election, Reform UK became the Official Opposition, and on 19 May 2026, Archibald was appointed Shadow Minister for Social Care in the Thomas shadow cabinet. She maintained the portfolio when re-appointed into the Jenner shadow cabinet in September. She is a member of the Senedd Health and Social Care Committee.

== Electoral history ==
Election	Seat	Party	Votes	Percentage (%)	Result	Source
Senedd, 2026	Ceredigion Penfro	Reform UK Wales	22,003	25.8	Elected	

== Personal life ==
Archibald lives in Pembroke, Pembrokeshire, Wales. She has three children.

== See also ==
- 7th Senedd
- List of Reform UK politicians
- List of female members of the Senedd

Political offices
Preceded by James Evans	Shadow Minister for Social Care; 2026–present	Incumbent
