= Henfynyw =

Village and community in Ceredigion, Wales

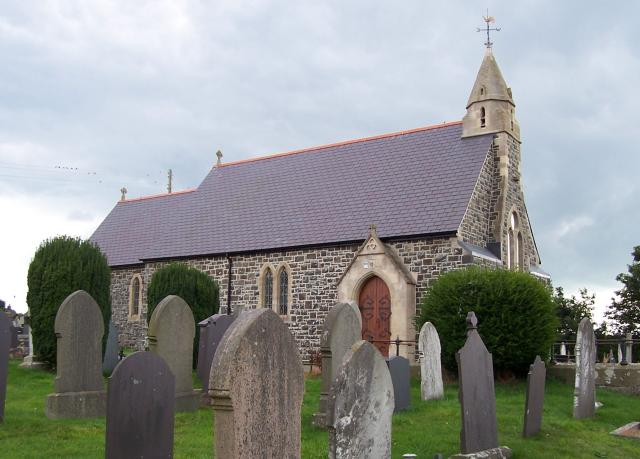

- Location within Ceredigion
- Population: 1,045
- OS grid reference: SN 4511 6113
  - Cardiff: 69.6 mi (112.0 km)
  - London: 183.5 mi (295.3 km)
- Community: Henfynyw
- Principal area: Ceredigion
- Country: Wales
- Sovereign state: United Kingdom
- Post town: ABERAERON
- Postcode district: SA46
- Post town: LLANARTH
- Postcode district: SA47
- Police: Dyfed-Powys
- Fire: Mid and West Wales
- Ambulance: Welsh
- UK Parliament: Ceredigion Preseli
- Senedd Cymru – Welsh Parliament: Ceredigion Penfro
- List of places UK Wales Ceredigion 52.226498°N 4.269209°W Community map: Map of the community

Henfynyw (Welsh pronunciation: [henˈvənɪu̯]) is a village and community in the county of Ceredigion, Wales, just outside Aberaeron, and is 69.6 miles (111.9 km) from Cardiff and 183.5 miles (295.4 km) from London. In 2011 the population of Henfynyw numbered 1045, with 54.3% of them able to speak Welsh. The community includes the villages of Ffos-y-ffin, Llwyncelyn and Oakford.

== Henfynyw church and St. David ==
By the twelfth century, Henfynyw church was dedicated to St. David, and early Christian lore had it that Henfynyw was the place where St David had spent some of his early years. For instance, the 'Holy Bard of Brecon' (Gwynfardd Brycheiniog, flourished 1176 AD) drew on this lore, when he included Henfynyw church in a poem. His "Ode to St David" listed the places in Wales that were then closely associated with St. David...

"And fair Henfynyw, by the side of the glen of Aeron,
Fields prolific in clover, and woods full of wealth."

There is now no sure evidence for Henfynyw in the life of St. David, but Henfynyw church is ancient and has an inscribed stone in the east wall dated to the period 600–800 AD.

== See also ==
- List of localities in Wales by population
