= Ystwyth Trail =

Multi-use rail trail in Wales

Coordinates: 52°21′35″N 4°02′0″W

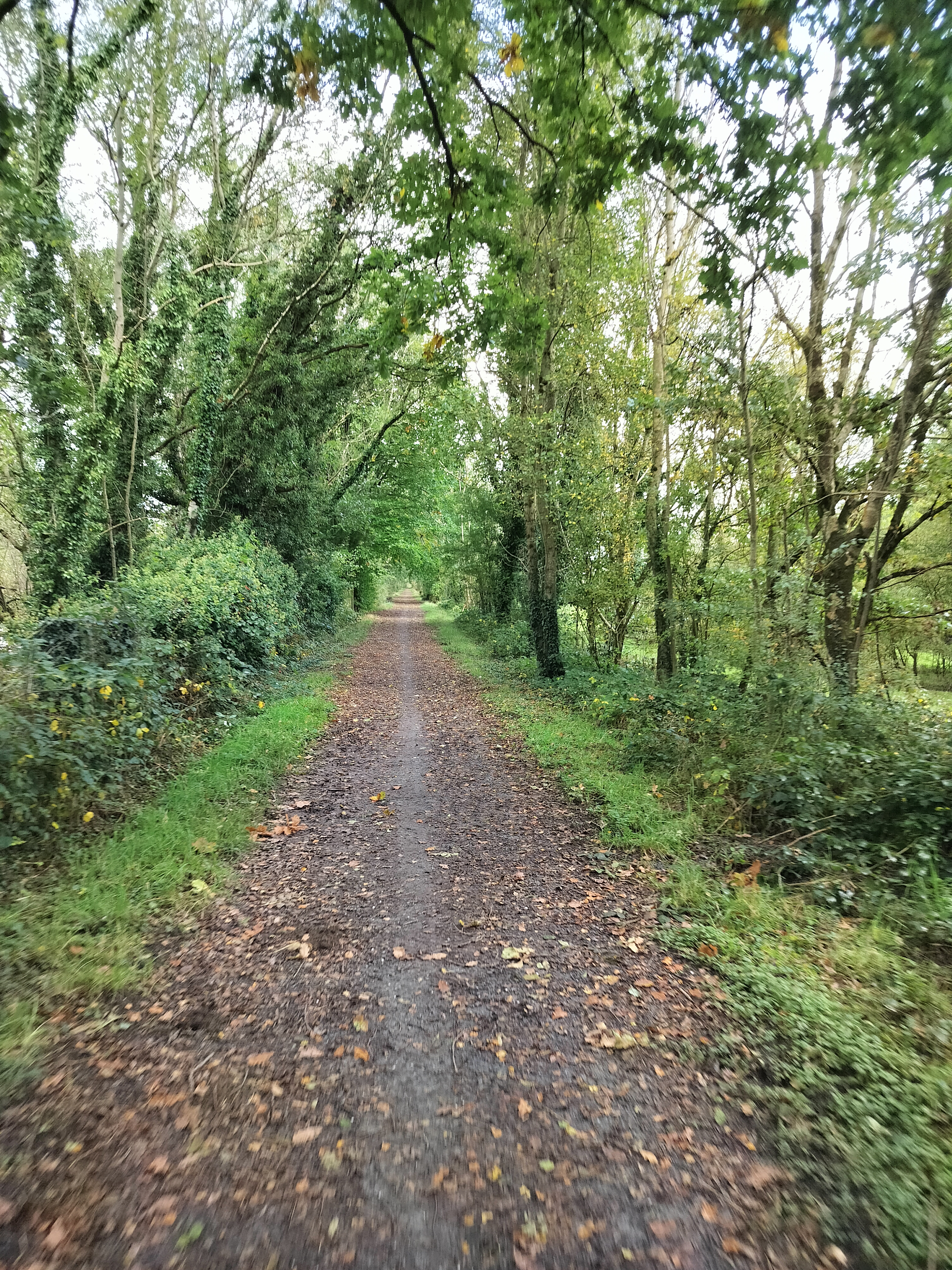
- Ystwyth Trail near Llanilar
- Length: 21 mi (34 km)
- Location: Ceredigion, Wales
- Trailheads: Aberystwyth, Wales
- Use: Hiking, cycling, horseriding (on certain sections)

The Ystwyth Trail is a 21-mile (34 km) multi-use rail trail linking Aberystwyth, Llanfarian, Ystrad Meurig and Tregaron in Ceredigion, Wales. Cycling and walking are permitted along the entire length while horseriding is permitted on several sections only.

The £1.7m Ystwyth Trail was partially completed in September 2008 and runs along part of the former track bed of the Old Manchester and Milford Railway, a Great Western Railway branch line opened in 1867, and closed as part of the beeching cuts in 1963. It remains incomplete today, with multiple road diversions due to objections during planning.

The Ystwyth Trail links with other routes via Lampeter and Devil's Bridge creating a link with both the Lôn Cambria and Lôn Teifi long-distance cycling routes (Sustrans national network routes 81 and 82).

== History ==
The Carmarthen to Aberystwyth railway was opened by the Manchester and Milford Railway (M&MR) in 1867, with the aim of providing a route from the industrial hub of Manchester, to the port of Milford Haven. However, the company faced repeated financial issues and was eventually sold to GWR in 1911, which was in turn nationalised in 1948 under British Railways.

By the 1960s, low levels of traffic and the resulting commercial losses led to the 1963 Beeching Report recommending the line's closure. In spite of the social implications on the region, the line was closed to both freight and passenger traffic by 1965.

In the 2000s, sections of the trackbed were purchased by Ceredigion Country Council, with construction of the Ystwyth trail partially completed in September 2008 at a cost of £1.7m. The trail remains in this incomplete state today.

== The route today ==
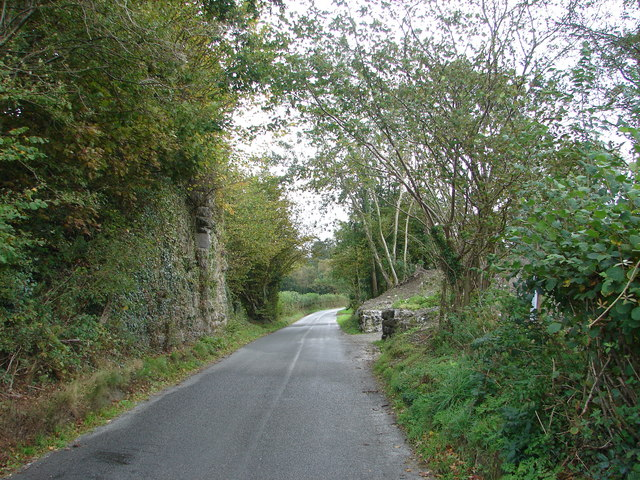
An on-road section of the trail near Trawsgoed

While much of the current trail follows the former rail line, several sections were not purchased to create the trail due to extensive lobbying by local councillors, due to objections from existing landowners and farmers. Diversions of the trail have now been carried out on existing roads, to link these missing sections, affecting the overall safety of the trail due to their narrowness, bends and high traffic speed limits. Due to these objections and lobbying, it is unlikely that the trail will be developed or completed any further.

The first half of the route largely follows the Ystwyth river, with the route being tarmacked from Aberystwyth to Llanfarian. After a section using a combination of farm tracks and rocky bridleways, the trail rejoins the trackbed, shortly before reaching Llanilar. The trail continues until Trawscoed, where the route is diverted again onto a minor road for a mile, before rejoining the former line to the B4340.

Now leaving the Ystwyth valley, the trail uses the B4340 for 2 miles, before rejoining the trackbed. After passing the site of the Strata Florida station, the route heads south in a near straight line for 2 miles skirting the edge of Cors Caron nature reserve. After a section paralleling the B4343, the route joins the road, taking it the final 1.5 miles into Tregaron.
