= Llain-y-gawsai =

Village and community in Ceredigion, Wales

Coordinates: 52°24′40″N 4°04′08″W

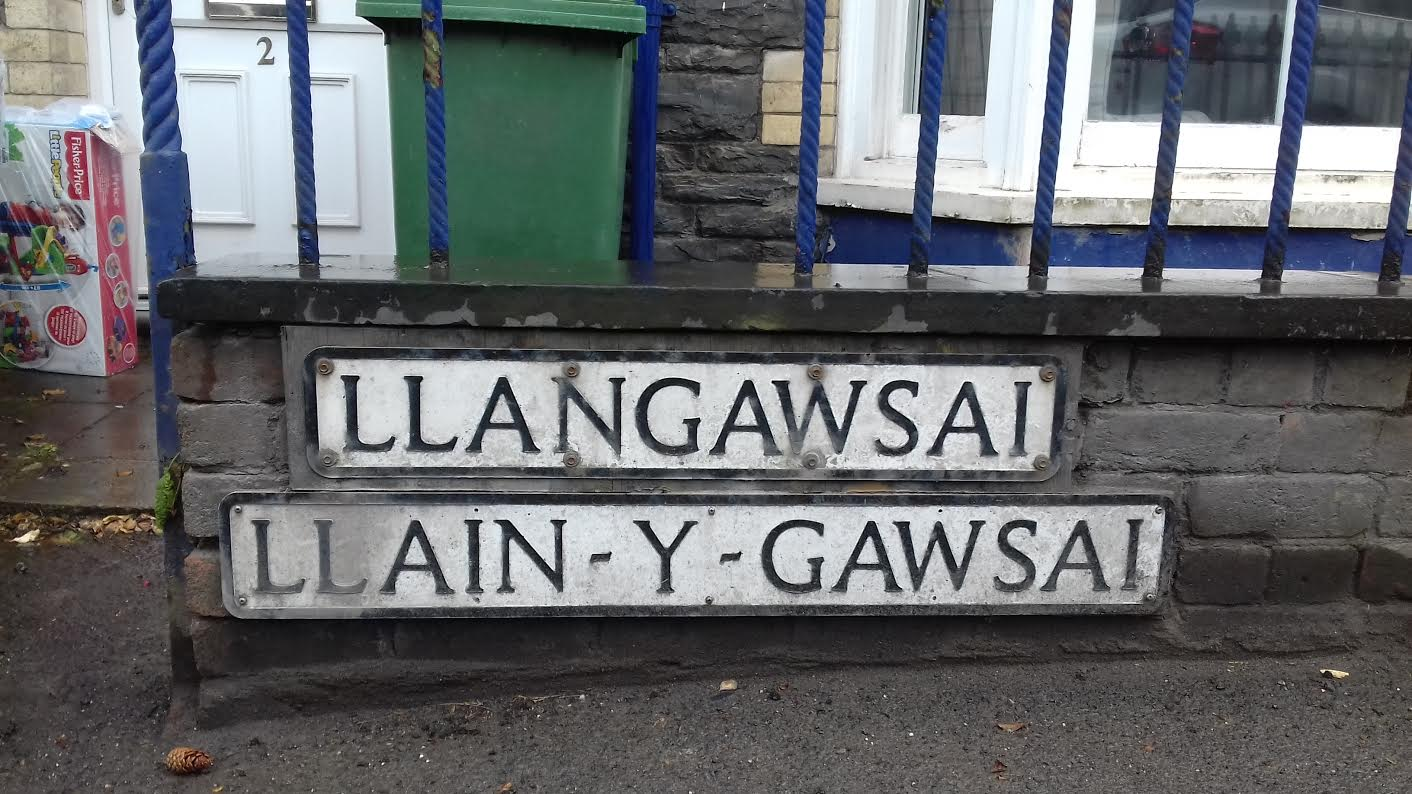

Llain-y-gawsai (also known as Llangawsai) is a village in Llanbadarn Fawr, Ceredigion, Wales. It is 74.6 miles (120.1 km) from Cardiff and 178.8 miles (287.8 km) from London. It is represented in the Senedd by Elin Jones (Plaid Cymru) and the MP Ben Lake (Plaid Cymru).

== Landmarks ==
- Windmill

== See also ==
- List of towns in Wales
