= Pen-dre =

Village in Ceredigion, Wales

Coordinates: 52.405781°N 4.051774°W

- Location within Ceredigion
- OS grid reference: SN 6052 8062
  - Cardiff: 73.9 mi (118.9 km)
  - London: 178.1 mi (286.6 km)
- Civil parish: Trawsgoed
- Community: Llanbadarn Fawr
- Principal area: Ceredigion
- Country: Wales
- Sovereign state: United Kingdom
- Post town: Aberystwyth
- Postcode district: SY23
- Police: Dyfed-Powys
- Fire: Mid and West Wales
- Ambulance: Welsh
- UK Parliament: Ceredigion Preseli
- Senedd Cymru – Welsh Parliament: Ceredigion

Pen-dre (also spelled as Pendre) is a hamlet in the community of Llanbadarn Fawr, Ceredigion, Wales, which is 73.9 miles (118.9 km) from Cardiff and 178.1 miles (286.6 km) from London.

== Governance ==
Pen-dre is represented in the Senedd by Elin Jones (Plaid Cymru) and is part of the Ceredigion Preseli constituency in the House of Commons.

== See also ==
- List of localities in Wales by population
