= Llwyncelyn, Ceredigion =

Village in Ceredigion, Wales

Coordinates: 52.212589°N 4.2830544°W

Llwyncelyn
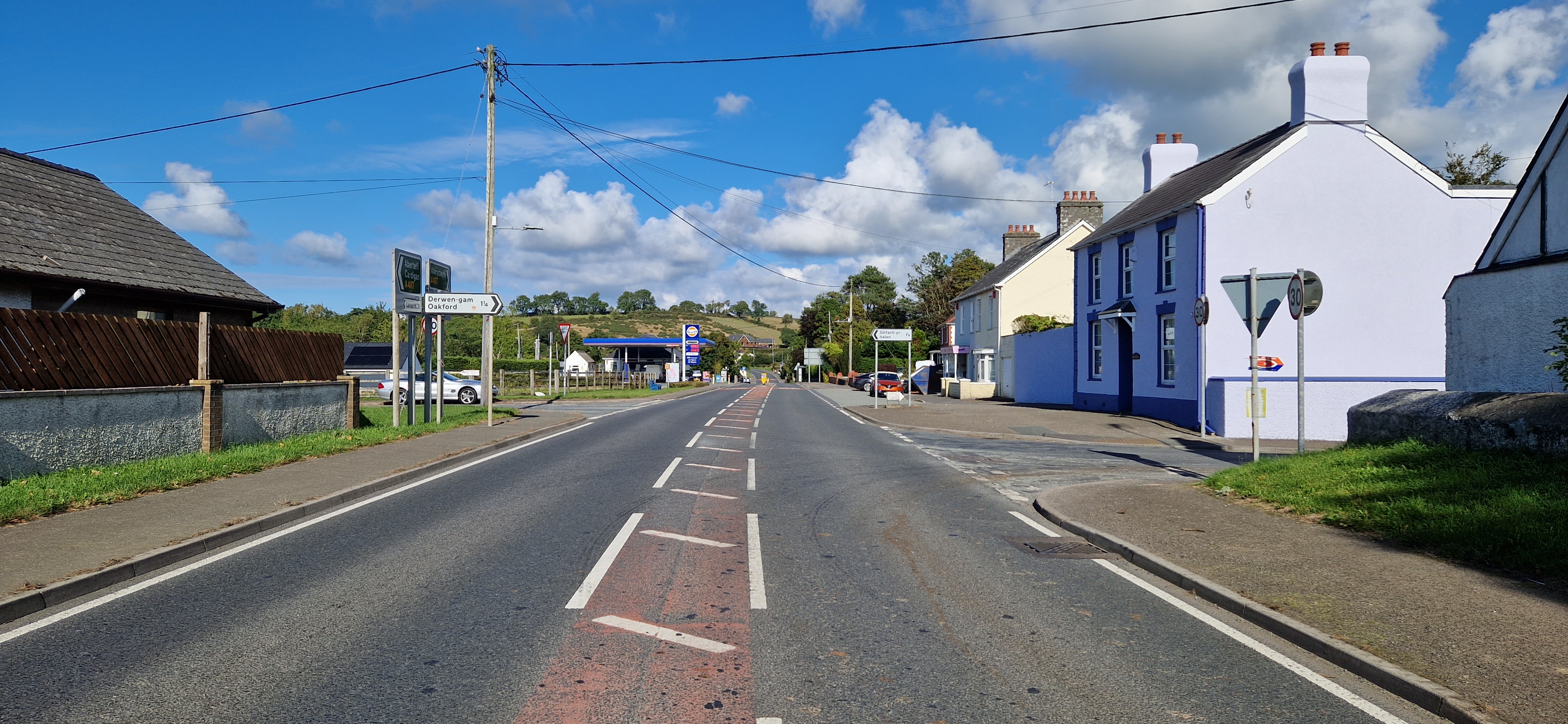
- Main road through Llwyncelyn

- Location within Ceredigion
- OS grid reference: SN441596
  - Cardiff: 69 mi (111 km)SE
- Principal area: Ceredigion
- Preserved county: Dyfed
- Country: Wales
- Sovereign state: United Kingdom
- Post town: Aberaeron
- Postcode district: SA46
- Dialling code: 01545
- Police: Dyfed-Powys
- Fire: Mid and West Wales
- Ambulance: Welsh
- UK Parliament: Ceredigion Preseli
- Senedd Cymru – Welsh Parliament: Ceredigion

Lwyncelyn is a village in Ceredigion, Wales, situated on the A487 trunk road approximately 2.7 mi (4.3 km) southwest of the town of Aberaeron and 2 mi (3.2 km) northeast of the village of Llanarth. The village forms part of the community of Henfynyw with most of the village situated along the A487 trunk road and the unclassified road leading to the nearby hamlet of Oakford, Ceredigion (Derwen Gam).

== Location ==
The Ceredigion coastline is 1.3 mi (2.1 km) miles away at the small shingle beach at Gilfach yr Halen. There are two small rivers running through Llwyncelyn. The Afon Cwinten to the North, and Avon Drywi to the South of the village.

== Amenities ==
The village has a petrol station with a convenience store and post office situated on the northern side of the A487, an animal feed store, a small home furnishing store, a farm shop and restaurant as well as a small chapel with cemetery, a village hall and a small caravan and camping park as well as a second camping site. There is also a nearby karting track.

=== Chapel ===
Llwyncelyn Welsh Independent chapel and chapel hall, along with the adjacent cemetery are situated on Rhydfach (the unclassified road running from the A487 to Oakford). The chapel was built in 1855 and became a Grade II listed building in 1964.

=== Village Hall ===
The memorial hall/village hall (Llwyncelyn Neuadd y Pentref) is situated off the A487 and contains plaques in honour of local men who died in the two world wars. The building has two meeting rooms, each with a capacity of twenty.

A defibrillator is located on the outside wall of the building.

=== Education ===
The local primary school (Penlôn) opened in 1878 and was closed in 2011 following a decline in student numbers from a high of 59 in 2006 to the review threshold of 20 in 2010 resulting in running costs per pupil being approximately 50% higher than the average for Ceredigion. The school buildings were sold off and were converted into a residential property. The nearest primary school is now in Aberaeron, as is the nearest secondary school

=== Public transport ===
The village is serviced by the TrawsCymru T5 bus services from Cardigan to Aberystwyth. The nearest train stations are in Aberystwyth and Haverfordwest.

== Gallery ==
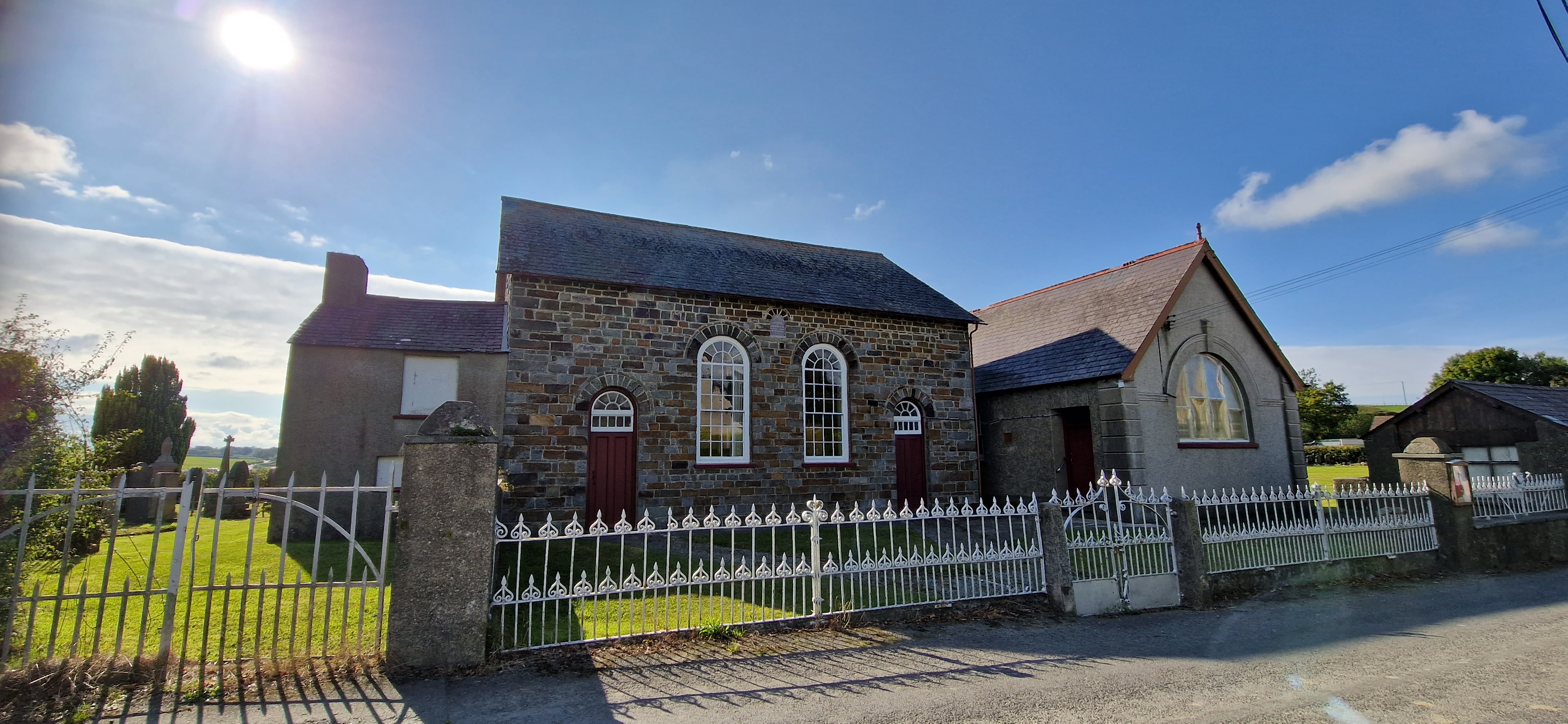
Welsh Independent Chapel, Llwyncelyn

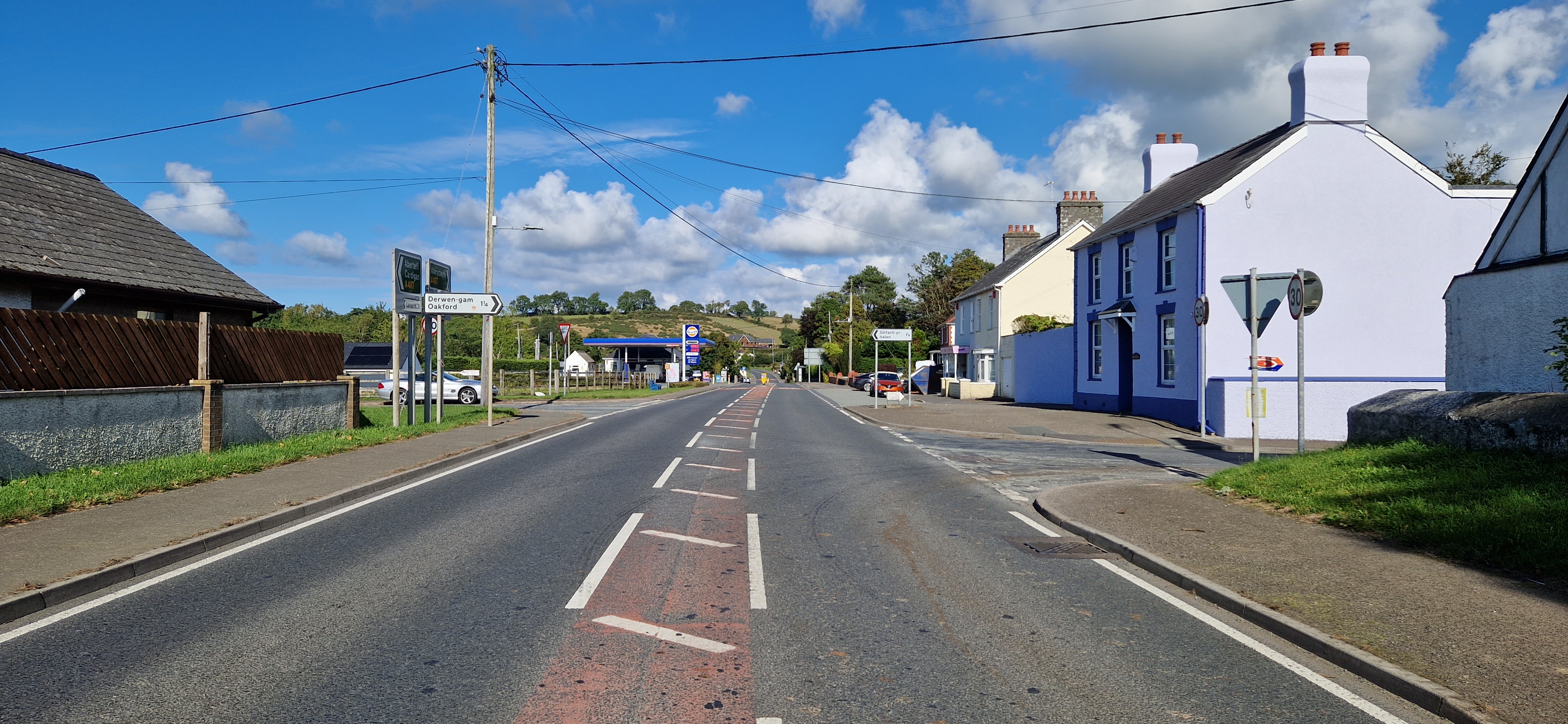
Main A487 Trunk road through the village, heading North

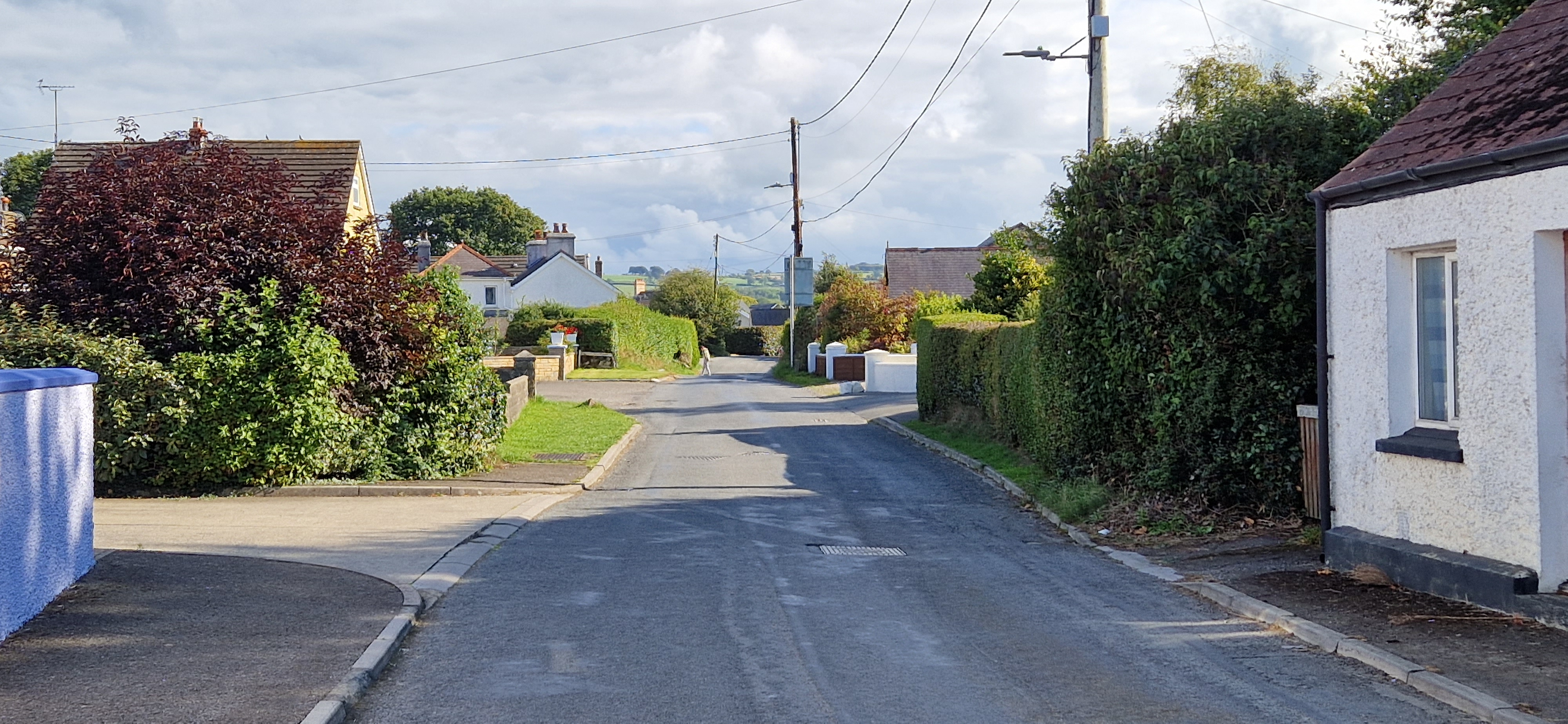
The unclassified road from Llwyncelyn to Oakford

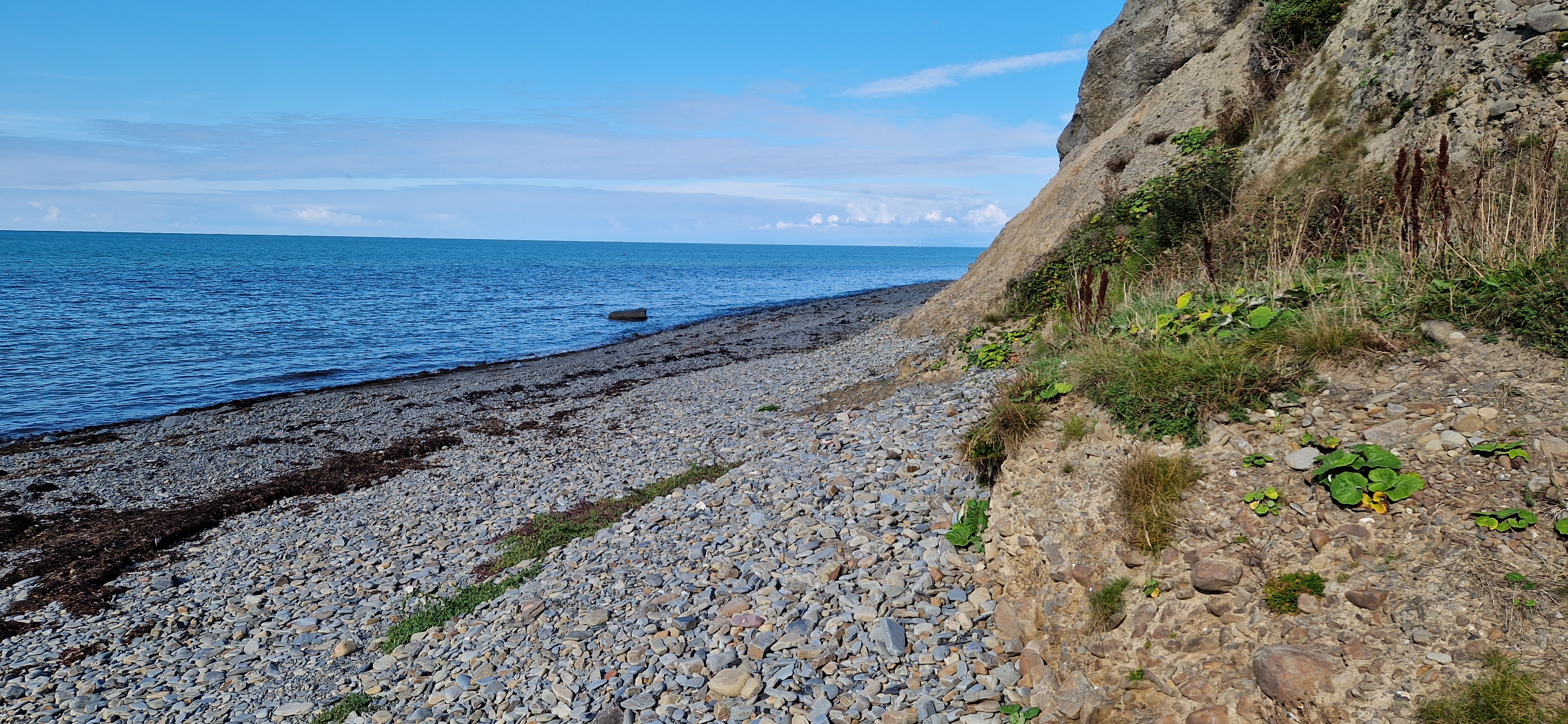
The nearby beach at Gilfach Yr Halen, looking North
