= Comins Coch =

Village in Ceredigion, Wales

Coordinates: 52.4218°N 4.0379°W

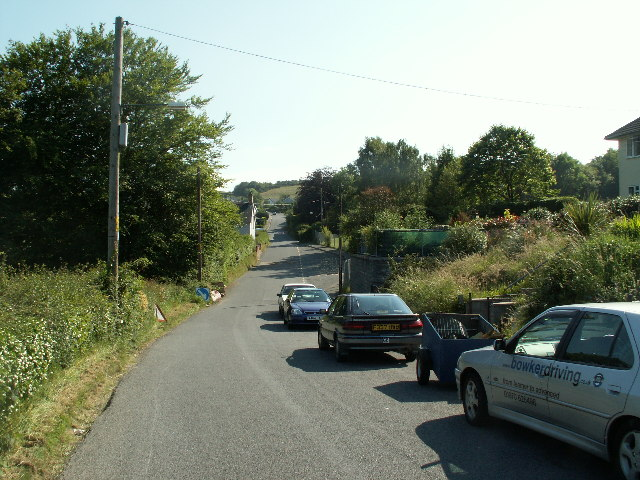

- Location within Ceredigion
- OS grid reference: SN614823
  - Cardiff: 90 mi (140 km)SE
- Community: Y Faenor
- Principal area: Ceredigion
- Preserved county: Dyfed
- Country: Wales
- Sovereign state: United Kingdom
- Post town: ABERYSTWYTH
- Postcode district: SY23
- Dialling code: 01970
- Police: Dyfed-Powys
- Fire: Mid and West Wales
- Ambulance: Welsh
- UK Parliament: Ceredigion Preseli
- Senedd Cymru – Welsh Parliament: Ceredigion Penfro

Comins Coch (also spelled Comins-coch) is a small village in Ceredigion, Wales, to the northeast of Aberystwyth. The village is covered by the Faenor community/parish council.

There are approximately 300 residents living in the village, which includes a primary school, phone box and a post box. The village incorporates two main housing estates, one consisting in part of rental and leasehold properties owned and managed by housing association Barcud Cyfyngedig.

Ysgol Comins Coch (Comins Coch Primary School) is currently the largest property in the village, with approximately 170 pupils and over 20 members of staff as of 2023.
