= James Evans (linguist) =

English-Canadian missionary and writing system creator

The Reverend James Evans
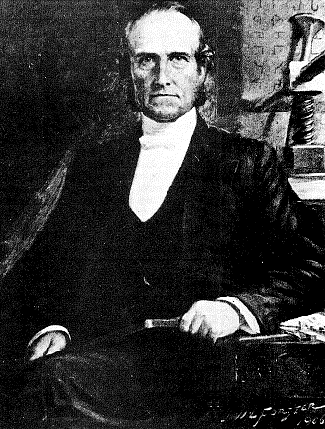
- James Evans
- Born: January 18, 1801; Kingston-upon-Hull, England
- Died: November 23, 1846 (aged 45); London, England
- Resting place: Norway House, Manitoba, Canada
- Occupations: Methodist minister and missionary, linguist
- Known for: Creator of the Canadian Aboriginal syllabics system for the Ojibwe language and the Cree Language and later adopted by Inuktitut

James Evans (January 18, 1801 – November 23, 1846) was an English-Canadian Wesleyan Methodist missionary and amateur linguist. He is known for creating the syllabic writing system for Ojibwe and Cree, which was later adapted to other languages such as Inuktitut.

== Life ==
Evans was born in Kingston-upon-Hull in England, but emigrated with his parents to Lower Canada in 1822, where he worked as a teacher. He later moved to Rice Lake and continued his teaching work.

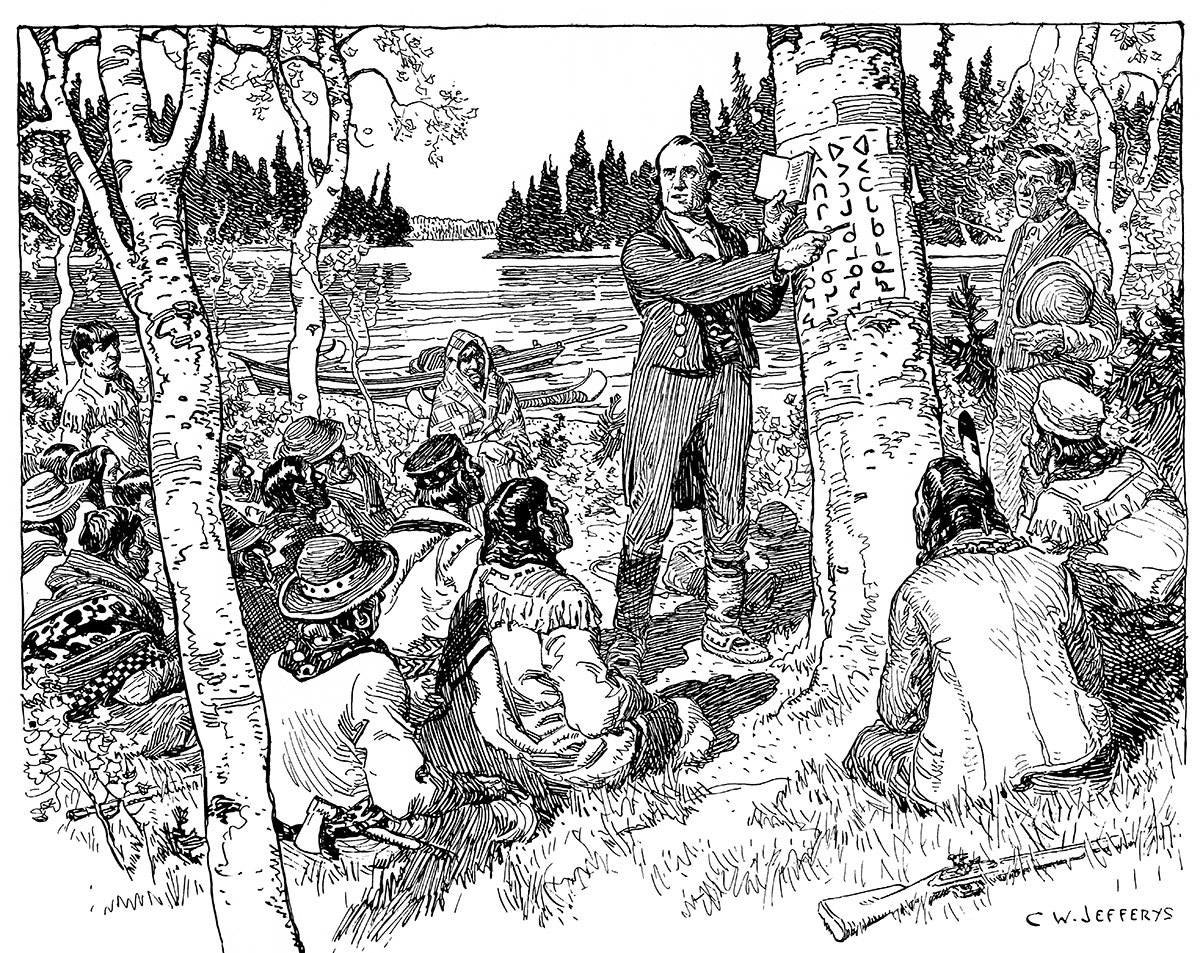
Teaching Indigenous Canadians his system

In 1833 he was ordained as a Wesleyan Methodist minister, and in 1840 he was given authority over the local district in Norway House in Manitoba. During this time Evans worked on the development of the Ojibwe and Cree scripts. Evans had picked up Ojibwe during his work among the people in Upper Canada. He created the Ojibwe script after first trying to apply a Roman script to their language. Later, he modified syllabics slightly and applied it to Cree, a related language. The syllabic writing system was inspired in part by Pitman Shorthand. They were easy to learn, and as a result, literacy rates among the Canadian Ojibwe and Cree likely outpaced those of neighboring French and English trappers, with one researcher claiming there was "near universal literacy" in the syllabics.

Evans's other missionary work was scarred by turmoil. Evans clashed several times with the Hudson's Bay Company, mostly over their treatment of the native population. Evans accidentally shot and killed his friend and co-worker Thomas Hassall in 1844. He was accused of sexual misconduct with native girls under his care. This was proven to be a ploy by the Hudson's Bay Company to discredit and incarcerate Evans, due to his unwavering dedication in helping the native people and his influencing them to avoid working on 'Sabbath'. Although he was acquitted, he was sent to London to defend himself again. The stress took a toll on his health, and he died of a heart attack in 1846. His daughter Clarissa Eugenia later married the HBC trapper and explorer John McLean, who became active in the Methodist community of Guelph, Canada West (now Ontario).

James Evans's grave was in England, but his remains were cremated and sent to Norway House, Manitoba.

== See also ==
- Other people named James Evans
