= Glanyrafon, Ceredigion =

Village in Ceredigion, Wales

Coordinates: 52.403°N 4.042°W

Glanyrafon
- Location within Ceredigion
- OS grid reference: SN612803
  - Cardiff: 73.6 mi (118.4 km)
  - London: 177.7 mi (286.0 km)
- Community: Llanbadarn
- Principal area: Ceredigion
- Country: Wales
- Sovereign state: United Kingdom
- Post town: Aberystwyth
- Postcode district: SY23
- Police: Dyfed-Powys
- Fire: Mid and West Wales
- Ambulance: Welsh
- UK Parliament: Ceredigion Preseli
- Senedd Cymru – Welsh Parliament: Ceredigion

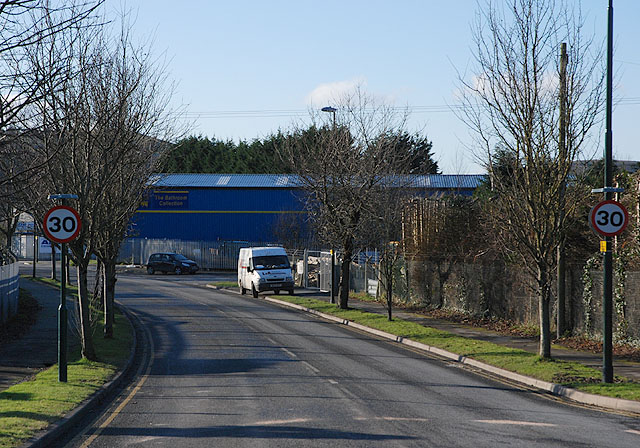
Road into Glanyrafon Industrial Estate from the east Three narrow lanes converge to form this broader highway.

Glanyrafon or Glanrafon is a small village and industrial estate in the community of Llanfarian, Ceredigion, Wales. It lies on the south bank of the Afon Rheidol, about 2 miles (3.2 km) north-east of Llanfarian village and the same distance east of the town of Aberystwyth.

Glanyrafon is represented in the Senedd by Elin Jones (Plaid Cymru) and is part of the Ceredigion Preseli constituency in the House of Commons.

== See also ==
- Glanyrafon railway station
- List of localities in Wales by population
