= Pont Paith =

Village in Ceredigion, Wales

Coordinates: 52.388519°N 4.052864°W

- Location within Ceredigion
- OS grid reference: SN 6039 7870
  - Cardiff: 73 mi (117 km)
  - London: 177.9 mi (286.3 km)
- Community: Llanfarian
- Principal area: Ceredigion
- Country: Wales
- Sovereign state: United Kingdom
- Post town: Aberystwyth
- Postcode district: SY23
- Police: Dyfed-Powys
- Fire: Mid and West Wales
- Ambulance: Welsh
- UK Parliament: Ceredigion Preseli
- Senedd Cymru – Welsh Parliament: Ceredigion

Pont Paith is a hamlet in the community of Llanfarian, Ceredigion, Wales, 73 miles (117.5 km) from Cardiff and 177.9 miles (286.2 km) from London.

== Governance ==
Pont Paith is represented in the Senedd by Elin Jones (Plaid Cymru) and is part of the Ceredigion Preseli constituency in the House of Commons.

== See also ==
- List of localities in Wales by population
