= Chancery, Ceredigion =

Village in Ceredigion, Wales

Coordinates: 52.370°N 4.086°W

Chancery
- Location within Ceredigion
- OS grid reference: SN581767
- Principal area: Ceredigion
- Country: Wales
- Sovereign state: United Kingdom
- Police: Dyfed-Powys
- Fire: Mid and West Wales
- Ambulance: Welsh
- UK Parliament: Ceredigion Preseli

Chancery (Welsh: Rhydgaled) is a hamlet in Llanfarian community, in the district county of Ceredigion, Mid-Wales, south of the administrative centre Aberystwyth. The hamlet is on the A487 road, about 0.9 miles (1.4 km) south-west of Llanfarian village.

A school at Chancery is referred to in a World War II children's evacuation account.
