= Glan-y-môr, Ceredigion =

Village in Ceredigion, Wales

Coordinates: 52.436581°N 4.080387°W

Glan-y-môr
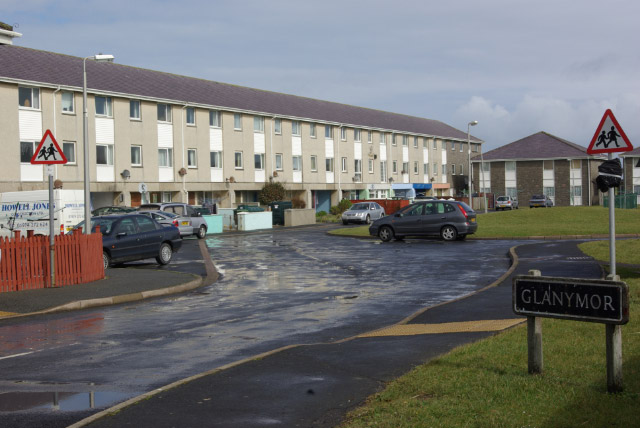

- Location within Ceredigion
- OS grid reference: SN 5867 8410
  - Cardiff: 76.4 mi (123.0 km)
  - London: 180 mi (290 km)
- Community: Tirymynach
- Principal area: Ceredigion
- Country: Wales
- Sovereign state: United Kingdom
- Post town: Aberystwyth
- Postcode district: SY23
- Police: Dyfed-Powys
- Fire: Mid and West Wales
- Ambulance: Welsh
- UK Parliament: Ceredigion Preseli
- Senedd Cymru – Welsh Parliament: Ceredigion

Glan-y-môr is a small village in the community of Tirymynach, Ceredigion, Wales, which is 76.4 miles (123 km) from Cardiff and 180 miles (289.7 km) from London. Glan-y-môr is represented in the Senedd by Elin Jones (Plaid Cymru) and the Member of Parliament is Ben Lake (Plaid Cymru).

== See also ==
- List of localities in Wales by population
