= Troed-yr-hen-riw =

Village in Ceredigion, Wales

Coordinates: 52.403844°N 3.852117°W

Troed-yr-Henriw
- Location within Ceredigion
- OS grid reference: SN 7410 8004
  - Cardiff: 70 mi (110 km)
  - London: 170.2 mi (273.9 km)
- Community: Blaenrheidol
- Principal area: Ceredigion
- Country: Wales
- Sovereign state: United Kingdom
- Post town: Aberystwyth
- Postcode district: SY23
- Police: Dyfed-Powys
- Fire: Mid and West Wales
- Ambulance: Welsh
- UK Parliament: Ceredigion Preseli
- Senedd Cymru – Welsh Parliament: Ceredigion

Troed-yr-hen-riw is a hamlet in the community of Blaenrheidol, Ceredigion, Wales, which is 70 miles (112.6 km) from Cardiff and 170.2 miles (273.8 km) from London. Troed-yr-Henriw is represented in the Senedd by Elin Jones (Plaid Cymru) and is part of the Ceredigion Preseli constituency in the House of Commons.

== Etymology ==
The name derives from the Welsh language: "The foot of the old slope".

== See also ==
- List of localities in Wales by population
