= Moriah, Ceredigion =

Village in Ceredigion, Wales

Coordinates: 52.395907°N 4.028968°W

Moriah
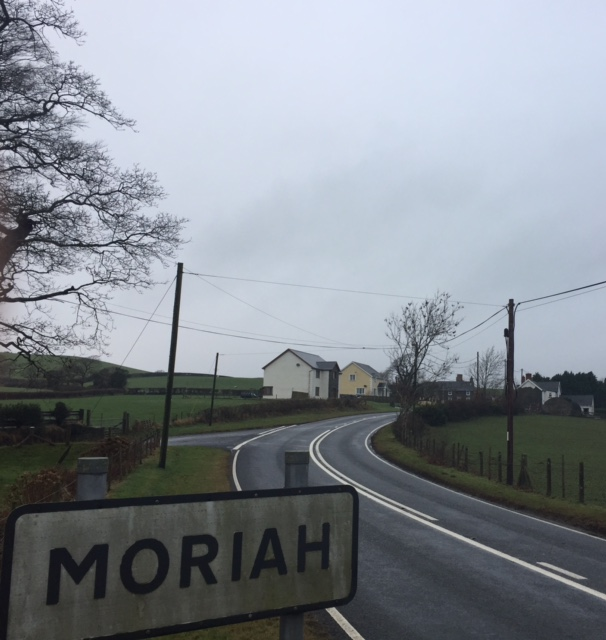
- Moriah, Wales from the A4120 facing west.

- Location within Ceredigion
- OS grid reference: SN 6204 7948
  - Cardiff: 73 mi (117 km)
  - London: 177.1 mi (285.0 km)
- Community: Llanfarian
- Principal area: Ceredigion
- Country: Wales
- Sovereign state: United Kingdom
- Post town: Aberystwyth
- Postcode district: SY23
- Dialling code: 01970
- Police: Dyfed-Powys
- Fire: Mid and West Wales
- Ambulance: Welsh
- UK Parliament: Ceredigion Preseli
- Senedd Cymru – Welsh Parliament: Ceredigion

Moriah is a hamlet in the community of Llanfarian, Ceredigion, Wales, which is 73 miles (117.4 km) from Cardiff and 177.1 miles (285 km) from London. Moriah is represented in Ceredigion County Council by Alun Lloyd Jones (Plaid Cymru), in the Senedd by Elin Jones (Plaid Cymru; 1999–present) and the Member of Parliament is Ben Lake (Plaid Cymru; 2017–present).

== See also ==
- List of localities in Wales by population
