= James Evans (historian) =

English historian and documentary maker (born 1975)

- Born: James Richard Evans; 17 December 1975 (age 50); Redhill, England
- Education: Oriel College, Oxford
- Occupations: Historian, popular historian
- Spouse: Nicola Pitt (m. 2006)

James Richard Evans (born 17 December 1975) is an English historian, author and television producer.

== Education ==
Evans grew up in Epsom and was educated at Whitgift School. Evans attended Oriel College, Oxford University. and studied History graduating in 1998. He went on to do doctoral studies at Oriel College where he wrote a D.Phil on the national question in the new state of Yugoslavia after World War I.

== Career ==
Since university he worked on producing multiple television historical documentaries as well as helping to write the accompanying books for the series.

His first major book, Merchant Adventurers: The Voyage of Discovery that Transformed Tudor England (2013) used the primary source of a story he came across during a television project. It tells the story of the failed 1553 voyage to reach China and the Spice Islands of the Company of Merchant Adventurers to New Lands and the principals, Richard Chancellor, Sebastian Cabot and Sir Hugh Willoughby. It was published in the US as Tudor Adventurers: An Arctic Voyage of Discovery: The Hunt for the Northeast Passage.

In July 2017 his second book Emigrants: Why the English Sailed to the New World, was published by Weidenfeld & Nicolson.

In July 2017 Evans was interviewed by Dan Snow for Dan Snow's History Hit Podcast.

== Publications ==
- James, Evans (2017). Emigrants: Why the English Sailed to the New World. Hachette. ISBN 978-0297866909.
- James, Evans (2014). Tudor Adventurers. Pegasus. ISBN 978-1605986111.
- James, Evans (2013). Merchant Adventurers: The Voyage of Discovery that Transformed Tudor England. Hachette UK. ISBN 978-0-29786-689-3.
- James, Evans (2008). Great Britain and the Creation of Yugoslavia: Negotiating Balkan Nationality and Identity. I.B.Tauris. ISBN 978-1845114886.

== Personal life ==
He lives in North London with his wife and three children.
