= James Evans (cricketer) =

English cricketer

Personal information
- Full name: James Evans
- Born: 9 November 1891; Shropshire, England
- Died: 26 August 1973 (aged 81); Upham, Hampshire, England
- Batting: Right-handed
- Bowling: Right-arm slow
- Role: Occasional wicket-keeper

Domestic team information
- Years: Team
- 1913–1921: Hampshire

Career statistics
Competition	First-class
Matches	15
Runs scored	196
Batting average	10.31
100s/50s	–/–
Top score	41
Balls bowled	126
Wickets	1
Bowling average	81.00
5 wickets in innings	–
10 wickets in match	–
Best bowling	1/34
Catches/stumpings	10/1
- Source: Cricinfo, 13 February 2010

James Evans (9 November 1891 – 26 August 1973) was an English professional first-class cricketer.

Evans was born in the historic county of Shropshire in November 1891. He made his debut in first-class cricket for Hampshire against the Marylebone Cricket Club at Lord's in 1913, with him playing in the same fixture the following season. Evans would enlist in the First World War with the 5th Battalion, Hampshire Regiment, alongside peers from Hampshire. Following the war, he played eleven matches for Hampshire in the 1920 County Championship, having started that season as an opening batsman, but later in the season he found himself batting from the lower order. He did little of note during the 1920 season, scoring 138 runs at an average of 10.61. He returned to play two matches for Hampshire in the 1921 County Championship against Lancashire and Yorkshire. Evans died in August 1973 in Upham, Hampshire.
