= Llanfarian =

Village and community in Ceredigion, Wales

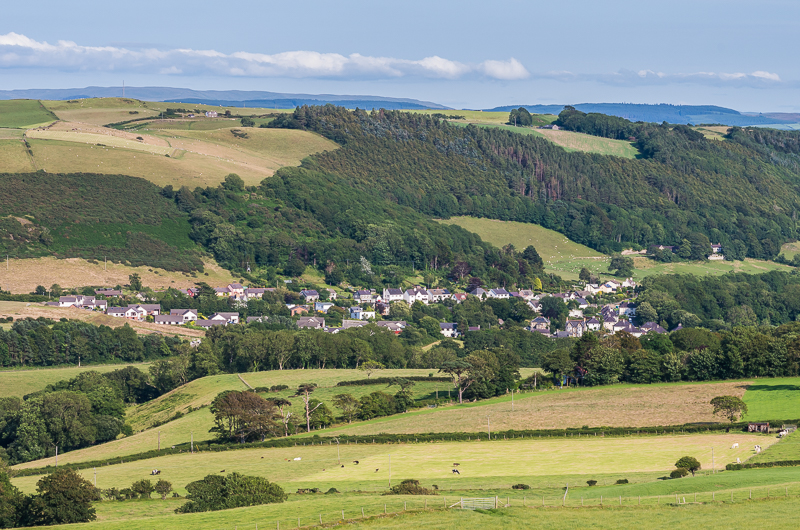
- View of Llanfarian village from the northwest

- Location within Ceredigion
- Population: 1,541 (2011)
- OS grid reference: SN592778
- Principal area: Ceredigion
- Country: Wales
- Sovereign state: United Kingdom
- Post town: Aberystwyth
- Postcode district: SY23
- Police: Dyfed-Powys
- Fire: Mid and West Wales
- Ambulance: Welsh
- UK Parliament: Ceredigion Preseli
- Senedd Cymru – Welsh Parliament: Ceredigion Penfro
- List of places UK Wales Ceredigion 52.380°N 4.070°W Community map: Map of the community

Llanfarian (Welsh pronunciation: [ɬanˈvarjan]) is a village, community and electoral ward in the county of Ceredigion, Mid-Wales, south of the administrative centre Aberystwyth.

Llanfarian village lies above the banks of the river Ystwyth in the Ystwyth Valley. The community – which includes the villages of Rhydyfelin and Glanyrafon, and the hamlets of Chancery, Pont Paith, and Moriah – had a population of 1,541 at the 2011 census.

== Amenities ==
Llanfarian is at the western edge of the Ystwyth Trail.

Llanfarian has one primary school, Ysgol Llanfarian. A school at Chancery is referred to in a World War II children's evacuation account.

== Historical notes ==
The now disused and dismantled Carmarthen to Aberystwyth Line stopped here at Llanrhystud Road station.

== Government ==
Llanfarian had a representative on Cardiganshire County Council from the formation of the authority in 1889. The first member was Morris Davies, a local farmer, who defeated Matthew Vaughan Davies of Tanybwlch by fifteen votes. Both stood as Conservative candidates. By the next election in 1892, Vaughan Davies had converted to the Liberal Party and captured the seat which he held for many years. In 1895, he was elected Member of Parliament for Cardiganshire.

== Notable residents ==
- Matthew Vaughan Davies of Tanybwlch, landowner and politician
- Peter Walter Davies of the Welsh Kite Trust
