= Glan-yr-afon, Bodffordd =

Coordinates: 53.284108°N 4.404729°W

Glan-yr-afon
- Location within Anglesey
- OS grid reference: SH 3978 7905
  - Cardiff: 135 mi (217 km)
  - London: 218.1 mi (351.0 km)
- Community: Bodffordd
- Principal area: Anglesey
- Country: Wales
- Sovereign state: United Kingdom
- Post town: Holyhead
- Police: North Wales
- Fire: North Wales
- Ambulance: Welsh
- UK Parliament: Ynys Môn
- Senedd Cymru – Welsh Parliament: Bangor Conwy Môn

Glan-yr-afon is a hamlet in the community of Bodffordd, Anglesey, Wales, which is 135 miles (217.3 km) from Cardiff and 218.1 miles (351 km) from London.

== See also ==
- List of localities in Wales by population
