= Troed y Rhiw =

Village in Ceredigion, Wales

Coordinates: 52°08′55″N 4°11′39″W

- Hamlet
- Location within Ceredigion
- OS grid reference: SN499522
- Principal area: Ceredigion
- Preserved county: Ceredigion
- Country: Wales
- Sovereign state: United Kingdom
- Post town: Lampeter
- Postcode district: SA48
- Police: Dyfed-Powys
- Fire: Mid and West Wales
- Ambulance: Welsh
- UK Parliament: Ceredigion Preseli
- Senedd Cymru – Welsh Parliament: Ceredigion Penfro

Troed y Rhiw (Welsh for 'foot of the hill') is a hamlet in Ceredigion, Wales, approximately midway between Cribyn and Dihewyd in the rolling agricultural land between Lampeter and Aberaeron. It lies between the land-holdings of Pont Marchog farm and Pen Bryn farm.

In the 19th century it boasted a chapel, which remains in occasional use, a shop and post office, a pub, and several cottages scattered around the road junction on which the hamlet sits. During the early 20th century the pub disappeared and is only marked by its ruins in a small copse. The shop and post office were lost in the early 1970s, which probably marked the time of least population. Subsequent new development behind the old shop and on the field below Pen Bryn Farm has substantially increased the size of the settlement.
