= Banc-y-môr =

Village in Ceredigion, Wales

Coordinates: 52.36086°N 3.957194°W

- Location within Ceredigion
- OS grid reference: SN668754
  - Cardiff: 69.4 mi (111.7 km)
  - London: 173.5 mi (279.2 km)
- Community: Trawsgoed
- Principal area: Ceredigion
- Country: Wales
- Sovereign state: United Kingdom
- Post town: Aberystwyth
- Postcode district: SY23
- Police: Dyfed-Powys
- Fire: Mid and West Wales
- Ambulance: Welsh
- UK Parliament: Ceredigion Preseli
- Senedd Cymru – Welsh Parliament: Ceredigion

Banc-y-môr is a small village in the community of Trawsgoed, Ceredigion, Wales, which is 69.4 miles (111.6 km) from Cardiff and 173.5 miles (279.1 km) from London. Banc-y-môr is represented in the Senedd by Elin Jones (Plaid Cymru) and is part of the Ceredigion Preseli constituency in the House of Commons.

== See also ==
- List of localities in Wales by population
