= Capel Dewi, Faenor =

Village in Ceredigion, Wales

Coordinates: 52.422255°N 4.016119°W

Capel Dewi
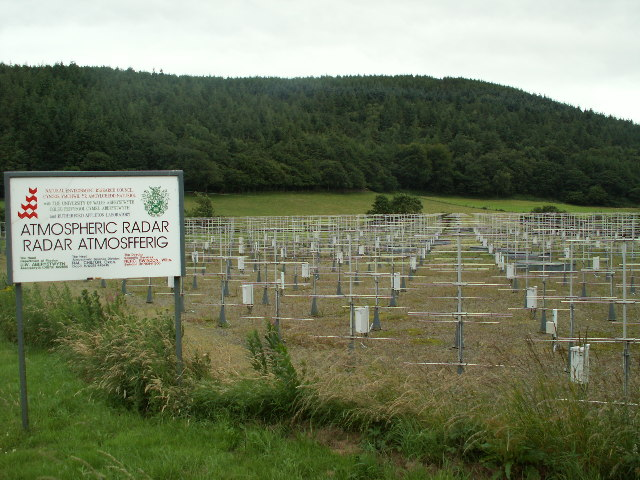
- Part of the LIDAR array at Capel Dewi

- Location within Ceredigion
- OS grid reference: SN608832
- Community: Y Faenor
- Principal area: Ceredigion
- Preserved county: Dyfed
- Country: Wales
- Sovereign state: United Kingdom
- Post town: Aberystwyth
- Postcode district: SY23
- Dialling code: 01970
- Police: Dyfed-Powys
- Fire: Mid and West Wales
- Ambulance: Welsh
- UK Parliament: Ceredigion Preseli
- Senedd Cymru – Welsh Parliament: Ceredigion

Capel Dewi is a hamlet in Ceredigion, Wales, approximately 3.5 miles (5.6 km) east of Aberystwyth. It is one of two settlements called Capel Dewi in the county, the other being Capel Dewi near Llandysul.

The majority of Capel Dewi lies south of the River Peithyll, a tributary of the Afon Clarach. One of the more unusual features of the hamlet is the nearby LIDAR system, which is run by the University of Manchester. In 2010 the LIDAR system at Capel Dewi provided vital information in the tracking of the ash cloud caused by the Icelandic volcano Eyjafjallajökull.

== Notable people ==
Stevie Williams, Olympic Games and Tour de France Cyclist
