= James Guy Evans =

American painter

- Born: New York City, New York, U.S.
- Known for: Painting

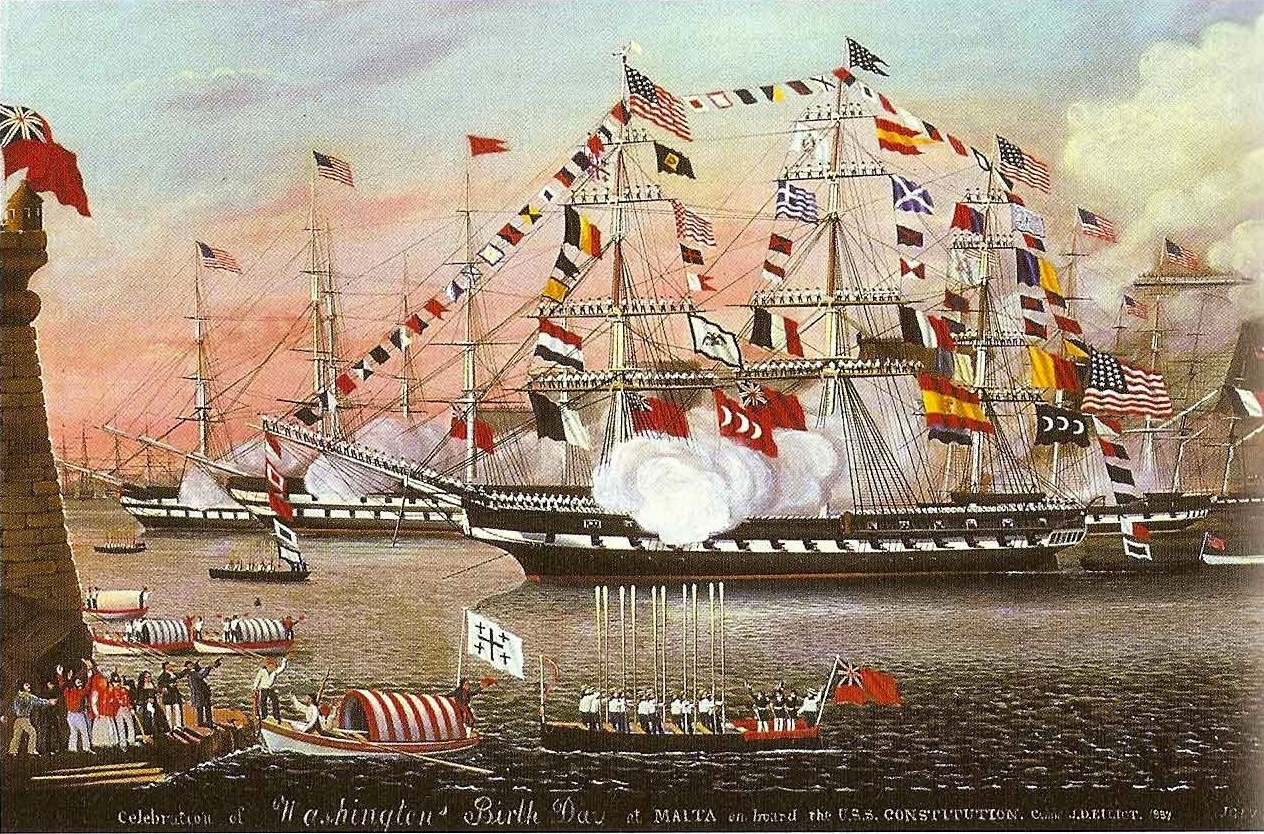
Washington's Birthday at Malta in USS Constitution, Commodore Jesse D. Elliott, 1837

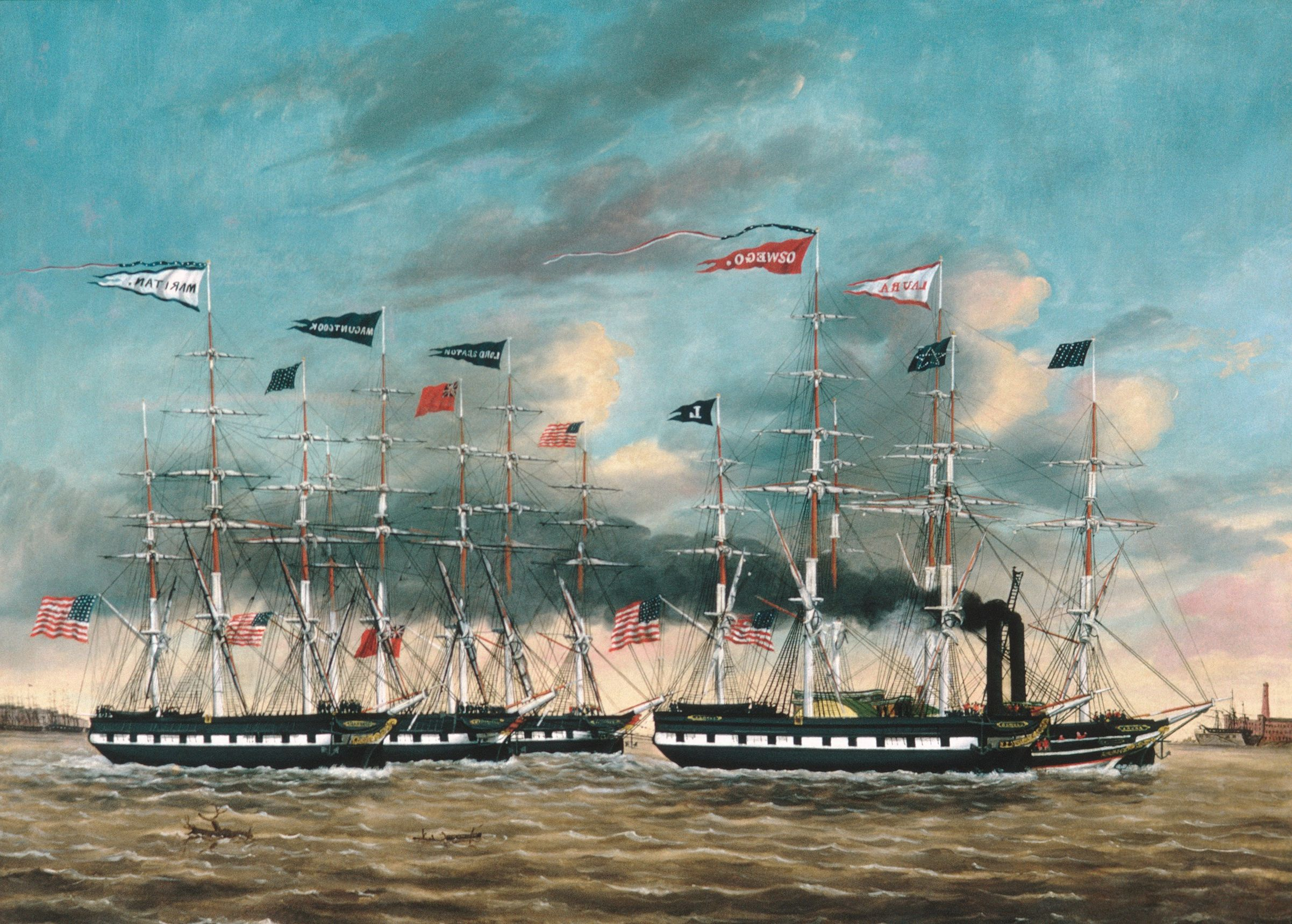
The Tow Boat Conqueror, 1852 painting by James Guy Evans.

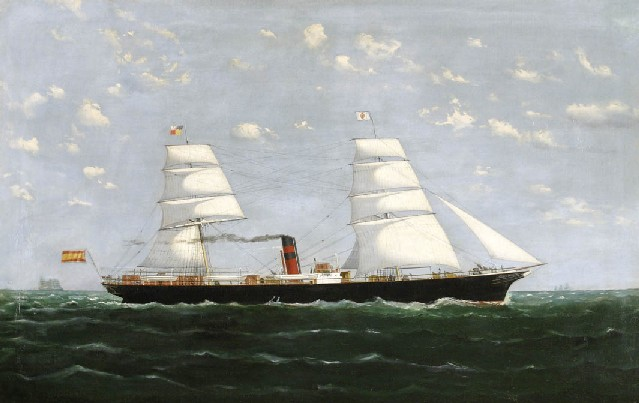
Frigate Aurelia, Captain D. Juan Netto, 1852 painting by James Guy Evans

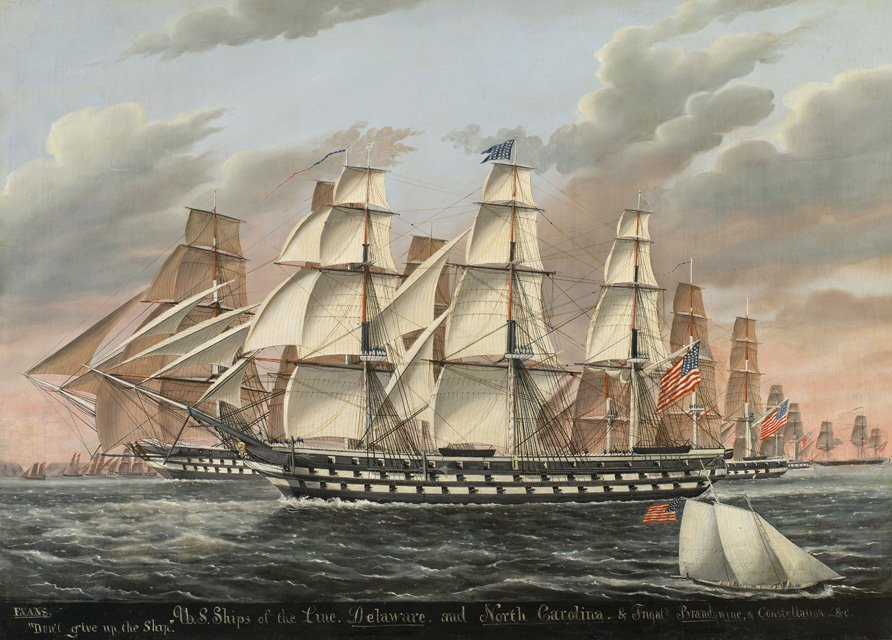
U.S. Ships-of-the-Line and Frigates “Delaware” and “North Carolina,” “Brandywine,” and “Constellation,” 1835-1860, c. 1835–1860 painting by James Guy Evans

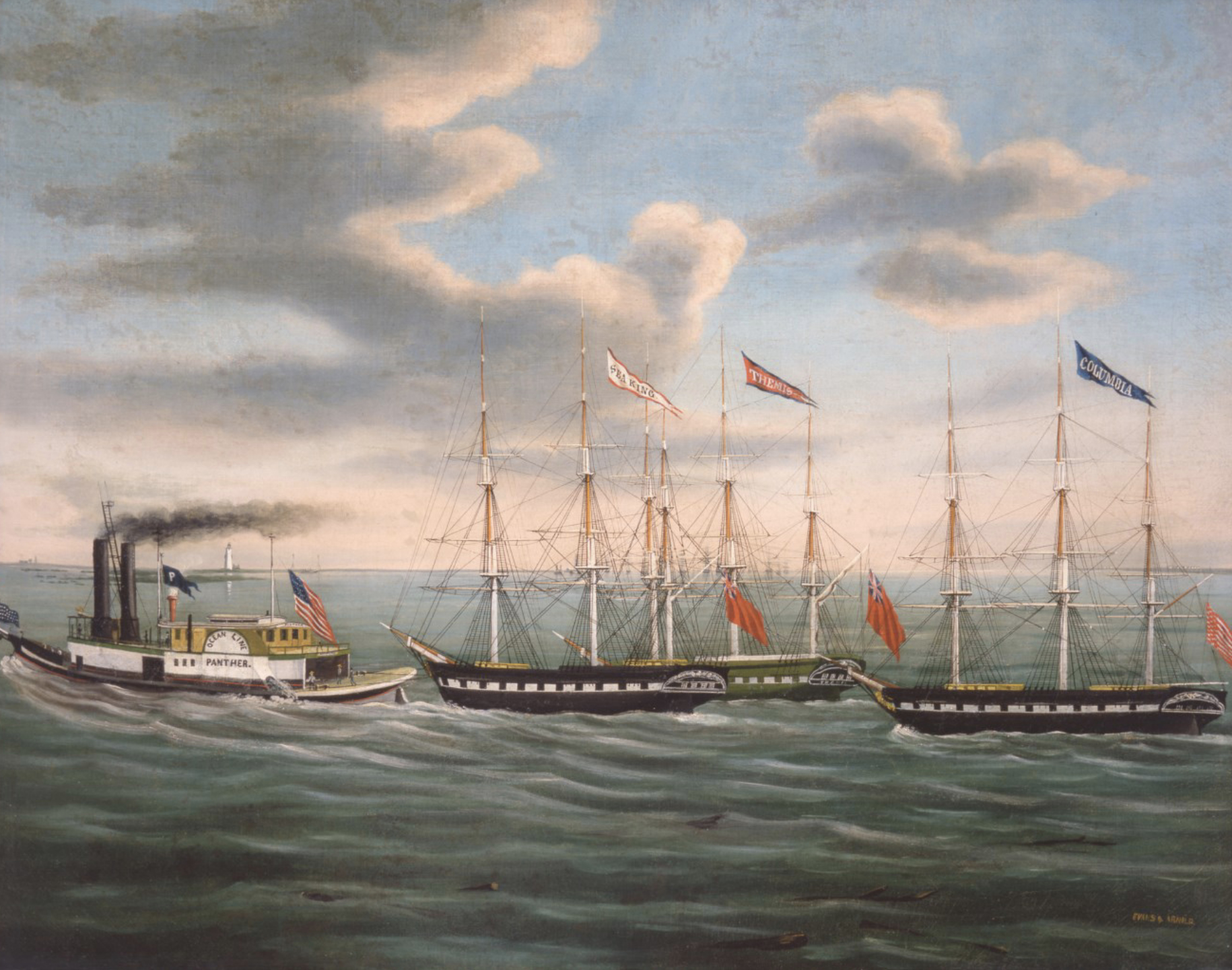
Tugboat Panther Towing the Cotton Ships Sea King, Themis, and Columbia Up the River to New Orleans, circa 1850 painting by James Guy Evans and Edward Everard Arnold

James Guy Evans (1809 or 1810 – 1859) was an American naval mariner and artist. Self-taught as an artist, Evans is known for his paintings of 19th century sailing ships, which are held in numerous museum collections.

== Early life ==
He was born in New York City in either 1809 or 1810.

== Naval career ==
When Evans enlisted in the U.S. Marine Corps as a private in July 1829, he listed his trade as a shoemaker. Shortly after enlisting he contracted fever and, on the request of his father, John Evans of Philadelphia, he was discharged as a minor in October 1829. Nine months later, in July 1830, he re-enlisted in the Marine Corps and served until he was discharged at Norfolk, Virginia, on 4 March 1836. Based on some of his known paintings, he may have served in USS Constellation in 1830-32 and he is known to have served in the ship-of-the line USS Delaware from 1832 to 1836. During this time, he became engaged to a Spanish woman named Ana on Minorca. He was discharged from his Navy service March 4, 1836. After his discharge, he re-enlisted and returned to Minorca to marry Ana. He remained there until 1838 or 1839, when he returned to New York. He lived for a time in Cuba from 1840.

== Art career ==
While significant details are known of Evans' naval career, comparatively less is known of his art career. A self-taught artist, it is believed that he began painting in watercolor in 1833.

Following his service in the navy, and having returned from Minorca, he moved to New Orleans in 1846, where he opened a commercial painting studio.

In December 1848, he was aboard the packet ship Ellerslie as it left New Orleans for Baltimore. He is described in contemporary accounts of the voyage as being both an artist and a minister. During the trip he produced a series of drawings commemorating the Ellerslie's captain's daughter, who died during the voyage. The drawings, known as the Ellerslie Log, are held in the Peale Museum.

In 1850-52 he took a partner in his New Orleans house, ship, sign and ornamental painting business, the German-born artist Edward Arnold (1824–1866). Together they worked on a panorama of the city that was never finished, and also signed several other paintings that they did together. In 1852-53, Evans took as a new partner an artist named Johnson, advertising their services in the newspaper as "Evans and Johnson House, Ship and Sign Painting, also, Historical, Marine and Ornamental Painting. Corner of Enghein and Poet Streets."

Around 1853, Evans left New Orleans to return briefly to Cuba. Little is known of his remaining years; He died in 1859.

== Works in collections ==
- Celebration Of Washington's Birthday at Malta On Board The USS Constitution, Commodore Jesse D. Elliott, 1837, collection of the U.S. Naval Academy Museum
- U.S. Japan Fleet, Como. Perry carrying the Gospel of God to the Heathen, 1853, collection of the Chicago History Museum
- The Tow Boat Conqueror, 1852, collection of the Metropolitan Museum of Art.
- The Great Republic, 1853, collection of the Smithsonian American Art Museum.
- The Dellaware and Potomac Struck by a White Squall, in the Gulf of Lyons, 1835, collection of the Franklin D. Roosevelt Presidential Library and Museum
- USS Constitution outside Malta, February 1838, Watercolor and gouache. Collection of the USS Constitution Museum.
- U.S. Ships of the Line "Delaware" and "North Carolina" and Frigates "Brandywine" and "Constellation, c. 1835–1860, collection of the New York Historical Society.
