= Ffoshelyg =

Village in Ceredigion, Wales

Coordinates: 52.22853°N 4.16852°W

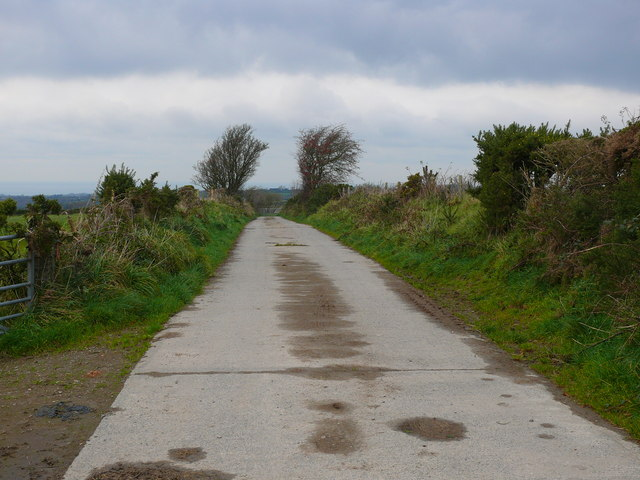
Near Ffoshelyg

Ffoshelyg is a hamlet in Ceredigion, Wales.

The estate at Ffoshelyg was once owned by Hugh Lloyd (fl. 1608). As of 2016 it is dominated by a family-run caravan park.
