= James H. Evans =

U.S. photographer

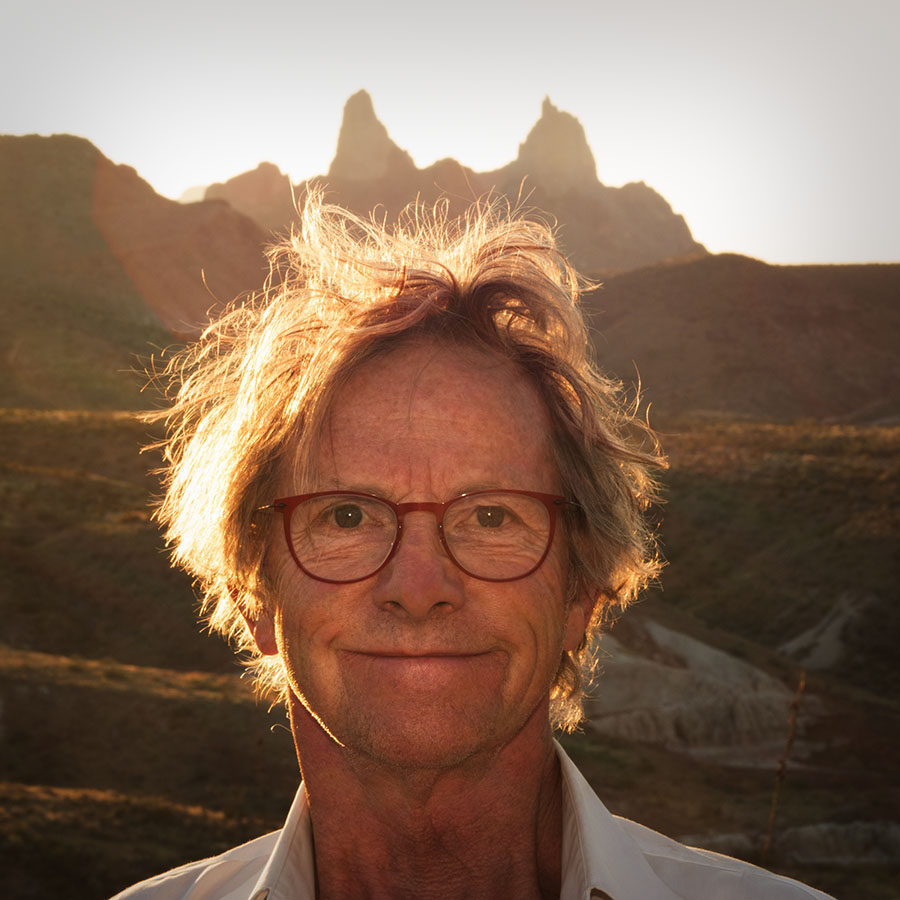
- Occupation: Photographer
- Website: jameshevans.com

James H. Evans (born 1954) is an American photographer whose work focuses on documenting the West Texas area. His work has appeared in Texas Monthly Magazine where he works as a photography contributor. James Evans has become the foremost interpreter of Texas's iconic Big Bend Region, which has been his life's passion and photographic subject since moving to Marathon, Texas in 1988. Approaching the rugged land and its people as an artist, documentarian, and historian, Evans has produced a body of work that rejects clichés in favor of honest, deeply observed photographs. Evans has dedicated his life to photographing every aspect of the Big Bend area including landscapes, nightscapes, people, animals, weather, and events for the past 37 years. The result is a vast archive of work that documents a place as it changes. Portraits of babies then men, grassland then fire, characters that are gone and a lifestyle that does not exist anymore best exemplify the importance of time as a major element of his work. In 2003, Evans released his first book, Big Bend Pictures, composed of his highly regarded black-and-white photographic work. This was followed by Crazy from the Heat in 2011 which presents Evans's most fully realized portrait of Big Bend, featuring magnificent landscapes in full color, including spectacular panoramas that reveal the immensity of the desert. It contains dramatic time-lapse, night photography and sensuous nudes that exhibit the striking similarities between the contours of the human form and the land. Completing the collection, several portraits of Big Bend residents reflect Evans's long connection with and affection for people of this remote place. Both books have sold out of all their printings. In 2024, in honor of the 20th anniversary, Big Bend Pictures was re-released including 11 updated images, more stories, and an additional foreword by Sterry Butcher. Throughout his career, Evans' work has continued to develop with variation in content and formatting of the images - a range between color, black and white, traditional darkroom, digital, square format, and long panoramas. His work has been featured in Texas Monthly and in many other publications both in the United States and the United Kingdom. His photographs are in the photography collections of the Museum of Fine Arts Houston, Texas; The Harry Ransom Humanities Research Center, Austin, Texas; The Art Museum of South Texas, Corpus Christi, Texas; The El Paso Museum of Art, El Paso, Texas; The Art Museum of Southeast Texas, Beaumont, Texas; The Longview Museum of Fine Arts, Longview, Texas; The San Antonio Museum of Art, San Antonio, Texas; The Grace Museum, Abilene, Texas; and the Witliff Collections, San Marcos, Texas

He has had two books published by the University of Texas Press; Big Bend Pictures (2003) and Crazy from the Heat: A Chronicle of Twenty Years in the Big Bend (2013). A third book Big Bend Pictures updated version was published in 2023. U T Press will publish A retrospective book in the Fall of 2027.

== Collections ==
His work is held in the permanent collection of the Museum of Fine Arts, Houston, the Art Museum of South Texas. Several of his prints are held in the Harry Ransom Research Center. His photographs are in the photography collections of the Museum of Fine Arts Houston, Texas; The Harry Ransom Humanities Research Center, Austin, Texas; The Art Museum of South Texas, Corpus Christi, Texas; The El Paso Museum of Art, El Paso, Texas; The Art Museum of Southeast Texas, Beaumont, Texas; The Longview Museum of Fine Arts, Longview, Texas; The San Antonio Museum of Art, San Antonio, Texas; The Grace Museum, Abilene, Texas; and the Witliff Collections, San Marcos, Texas

== Selected Exhibitions ==
2024 Foltz Fine Art, Houston, Texas 2019 Foltz Fine Art, Houston, Texas 2016 Hunt Gallery, San Antonio, Texas 2015 Stephen L. Clark Gallery, Austin, Texas 2013 Stephen L. Clark Gallery, Austin, Texas 2008 Stephen L. Clark Gallery, Austin, Texas 2008 Art Museum of South Texas, Corpus Christi, Texas 2008 Al Rendon Gallery, San Antonio, Texas 2008 Stephen L. Clark Gallery, Austin, Texas 2007 Westin Hotel, Dallas, Texas 2007 Alpine Gallery Night, Alpine, Texas 2005 Adair Margo Gallery, El Paso, Texas 2004 Al Rendon Gallery, San Antonio, Texas 2004 Tadu Contemporary Art, Santa Fe, New Mexico 2004 Adair Margo Gallery, El Paso, Texas 2003 Stephen L. Clark Gallery, Austin, Texas 2003 Galveston Arts Center, Galveston, Texas 2003 Museum of the Big Bend, Alpine, Texas 2002 Adair Margo Gallery, El Paso, Texas 2002 Terlingua House, Alpine, Texas 2001 El Paso Museum of Art, El Paso, Texas 2001 Houston Center of Photography, Houston, Texas 2001 Afterimage Gallery, Dallas, Texas 2001 Anam Cara Gallery, Ketchum, Idaho 2001 Marfa Book Company, Marfa, Texas 2000 Longview Museum or Art, Longview, Texas 1999 Austin Museum of Art, Austin, Texas 1998 Stephen L. Clark Gallery, Austin, Texas
