= Jimmy Evans (footballer, born 1894) =

Welsh footballer

Personal information
- Full name: James Henry Evans
- Date of birth: 29 November 1894
- Place of birth: Rhyl, Wales
- Date of death: 25 April 1975 (aged 80)
- Place of death: Rhuddlan, Wales
- Height: 5 ft 6 in (1.68 m)
- Position: Full back

Senior career*
Years	Team	Apps	(Gls)
- Rhyl Athletic
- Ton Pentre
1919–1923	Southend United	121	(14)
1923–1925	Burnley	20	(0)
1925–1926	Swansea Town	7	(0)
1926–1927	Rhyl Athletic		

International career
1922–1923	Wales	4	(0)
- * Club domestic league appearances and goals

James Henry Evans (29 November 1894 – 25 April 1975) was a Welsh association footballer who played as a full back in the 1920s. He began his career with local side Rhyl Athletic before playing for Southern Football League side Ton Pentre and Southend United.

He remained with Southend when the club joined the Football League in 1920 and later captained the side. He joined Burnley in 1923 before finishing his professional career with Swansea Town.

He won four caps for the Wales national football team, the first of which was obtained against Scotland in 1922.

== Career ==
Evans was born in Rhyl. His uncle Harry Stafford was also a footballer with Manchester United. Evans began his career with local amateur side Rhyl Athletic. He later joined Southern Football League club Ton Pentre. He joined Southend United, also of the Southern League, in 1919 and remained with the side when it joined the newly formed Football League Third Division in 1920. Evans developed a reputation as a penalty kick specialist during his time with the Southend and finished the 1921–22 season as the club's top goalscorer, scoring 10 of his 11 attempts during the campaign. He was later appointed club captain before eventually being sold to Burnley in April 1923 for £1000. The fee was a club record amount for Southend that stood for 15 years, until Doug Wright moved to Newcastle United in 1938.

Evans spent two years with Burnley, making 20 appearances before joining Swansea Town in 1925. He later finished his career with his first club, Rhyl Athletic.

During his career, Evans won four international caps for Wales. He made his debut in a 2–1 victory over Scotland on 4 February 1922 and played in his side's two further fixtures in the 1921–22 British Home Championship. He played one more match for Wales, against Scotland in 1923.

== Later life ==
After retiring from playing, Evans worked as a trainer for Rhyl before working at the team's social club.
