= Faenor, Ceredigion =

Community in Ceredigion, Wales

Faenor: Welsh: Y Faenor
- Location within Ceredigion
- Population: 2,545 (2011)
- OS grid reference: SN6589
  - Cardiff: 90 mi (140 km)SE
- Community: Faenor
- Principal area: Ceredigion
- Preserved county: Dyfed
- Country: Wales
- Sovereign state: United Kingdom
- Post town: ABERYSTWYTH
- Postcode district: SY23
- Dialling code: 01970
- Police: Dyfed-Powys
- Fire: Mid and West Wales
- Ambulance: Welsh
- UK Parliament: Ceredigion Preseli
- Senedd Cymru – Welsh Parliament: Ceredigion Penfro
- List of places UK Wales Ceredigion 52.425454°N 4.035931°W Community map: Map of the community

Faenor is a community and electoral ward sharing a boundary with the town of Aberystwyth in Ceredigion, Wales.

Faenor also has two community wards which elect 12 councillors to Faenor Community Council: One covers Waun Fawr and most of the student village Pentre Jane Morgan of Aberystwyth University, while the other covers Comins Coch, Capel Dewi and Lovesgrove.

Most of the houses in Faenor were built from the 1960s onwards to house the expanding population of Aberystwyth and its University. Pentre Jane Morgan is purpose-built student accommodation on land which used to be part of the University farm until the 1990s.
