= Llanbadarn Fawr, Ceredigion =

Village and community in Ceredigion, Wales

Llanbadarn Fawr
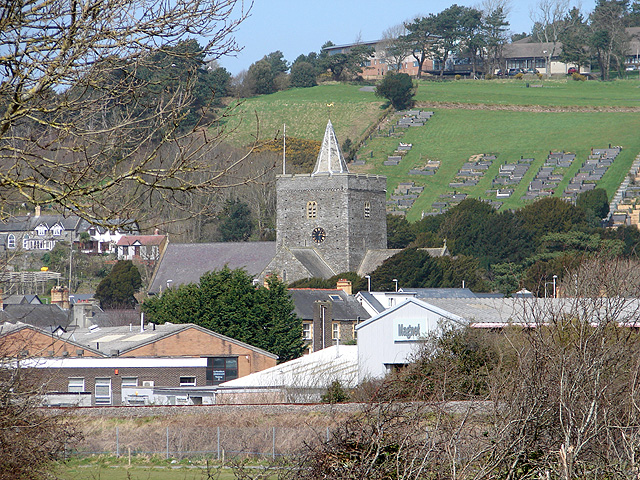
- Llanbadarn Fawr Parish Church dedicated to St Padarn; the current church dates from 1257.

- Location within Ceredigion
- Population: 3,380 (2011)
- OS grid reference: SN599808
  - Cardiff: 90 mi (140 km)SE
- Community: Llanbadarn Fawr
- Principal area: Ceredigion
- Preserved county: Dyfed
- Country: Wales
- Sovereign state: United Kingdom
- Post town: Aberystwyth
- Postcode district: SY23
- Dialling code: 01970
- Police: Dyfed-Powys
- Fire: Mid and West Wales
- Ambulance: Welsh
- UK Parliament: Ceredigion Preseli
- Senedd Cymru – Welsh Parliament: Ceredigion Penfro
- List of places UK Wales Ceredigion 52.408°N 4.060°W Community map: Map of the community

Llanbadarn Fawr (Welsh pronunciation: [ɬanˌbadarn ˈvau̯r]) is a village and community in Ceredigion, Wales. It is on the outskirts of Aberystwyth next to Penparcau and Southgate, and contains the hamlet Pen-dre. It forms the eastern part of the continually built-up area of Aberystwyth. It holds two electoral wards, Padarn and Sulien which elect a Ceredigion County Councillor each and several Llanbadarn Fawr Community Councillors. At the 2001 census its population as a community was recorded at 2,899, increasing to 3,380 at the 2011 census.

== Attractions, history and amenities ==
Llanbadarn Fawr is named after the church of Padarn (the great church of Padarn), and dates from the sixth century. It predates Aberystwyth, whose castle was originally named after Llanbadarn.

Notable buildings include Saint Padarn's Church, a fine, partly Romanesque parish church on the site of the mother church founded by Padarn (Paternus) in the 6th century and which contains notable 18th-century wall monuments. The Garreg Fawr stone slab, reputed to be the capstone of a now-vanished chamber tomb, is mounted on a plinth in Llanbadarn Fawr Square. This slab once stood on four upright stones before being fractured by fire in the 19th century, after which it was reassembled and mounted in its present location. There is also a windmill in Llain-y-gawsai.

Llanbadarn Fawr has two pubs, The Black Lion and The Gogerddan Arms, and the University's Llanbadarn campus, which concentrates on subjects such as business, law, criminology and information science, and Coleg Ceredigion's Aberystwyth campus.

Padarn United F.C. play their football in the Cambrian Tyres League.

In the spring, summer and autumn months the village has train services provided by The Vale of Rheidol Railway to Devil's Bridge, Capel Bangor and Aberystwyth.

The church is famous for its association with the 14th-century poet Dafydd ap Gwilym, in particular his poem The Girls of Llanbadarn.

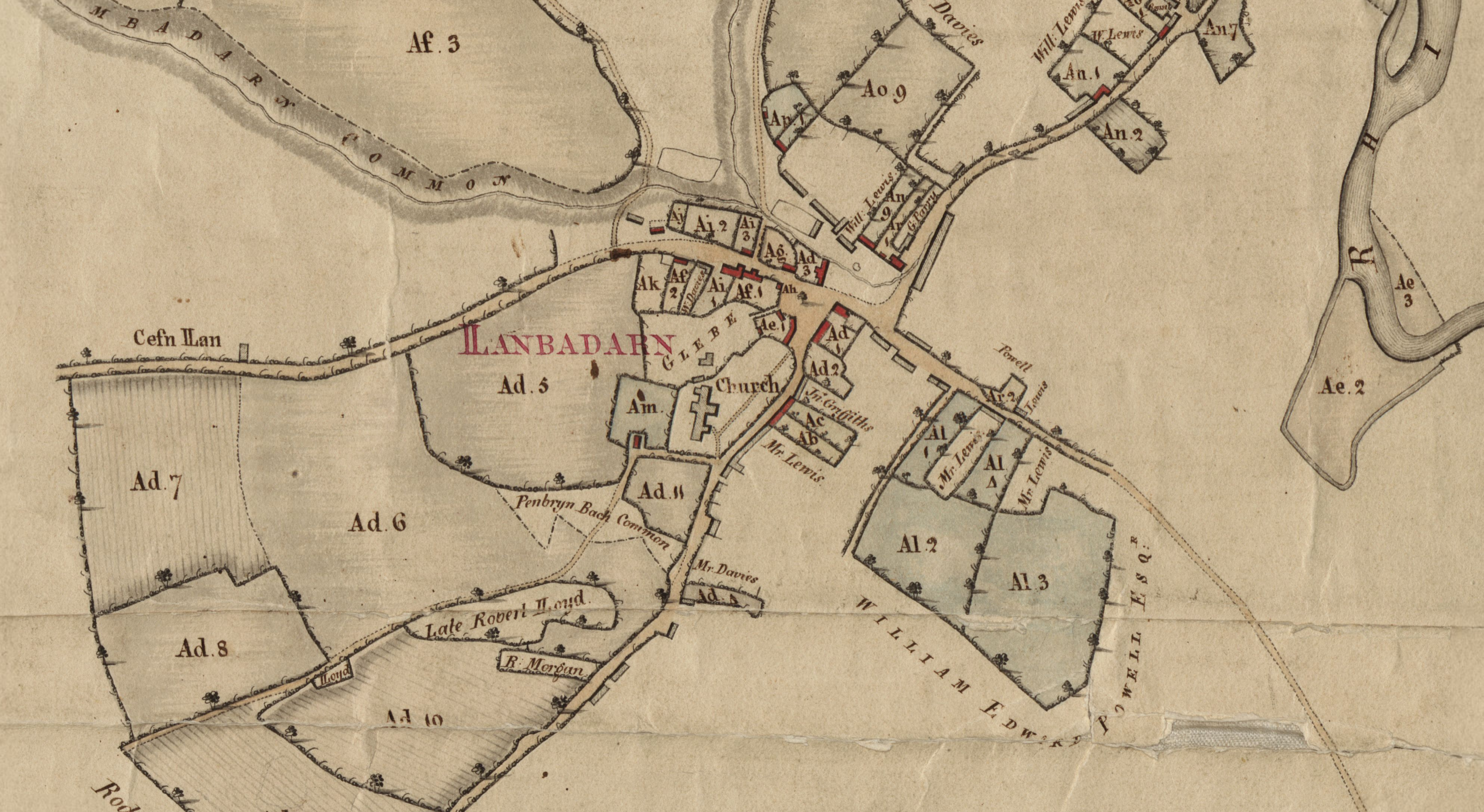
A map of Llanbadarn Fawr, c. 1800

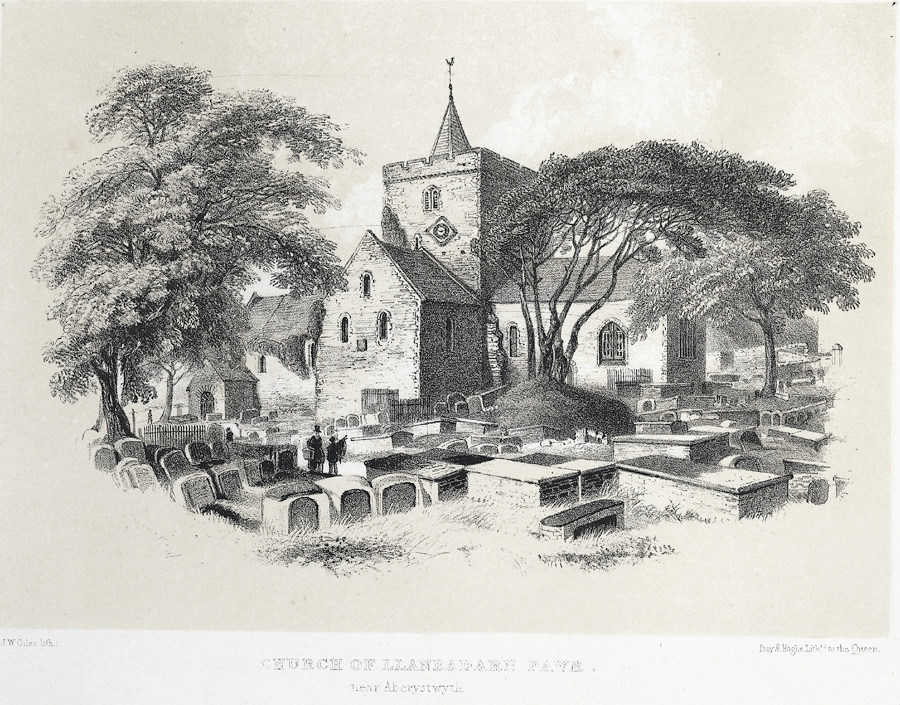
The church, c. 1850

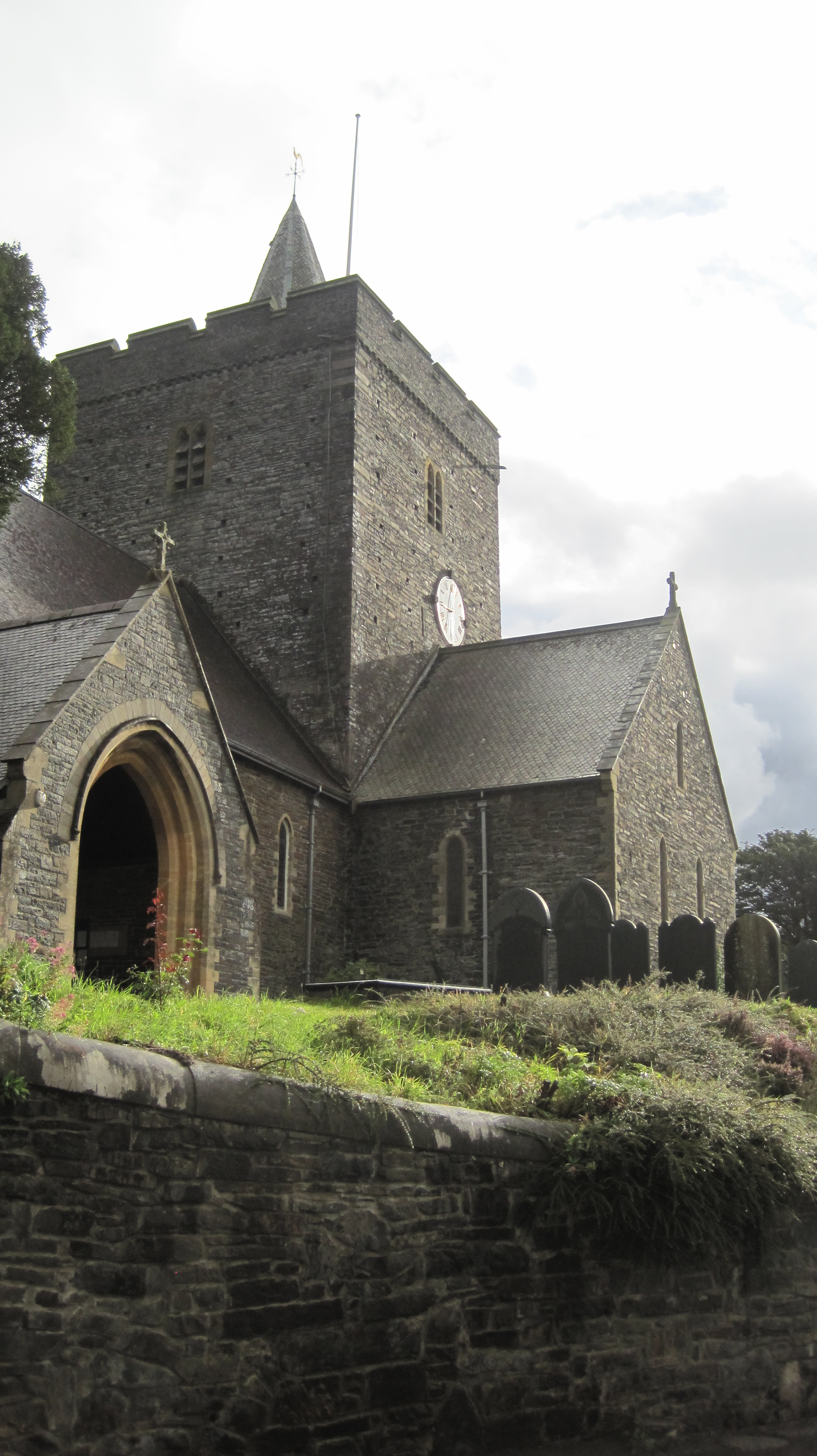
South entrance of the church

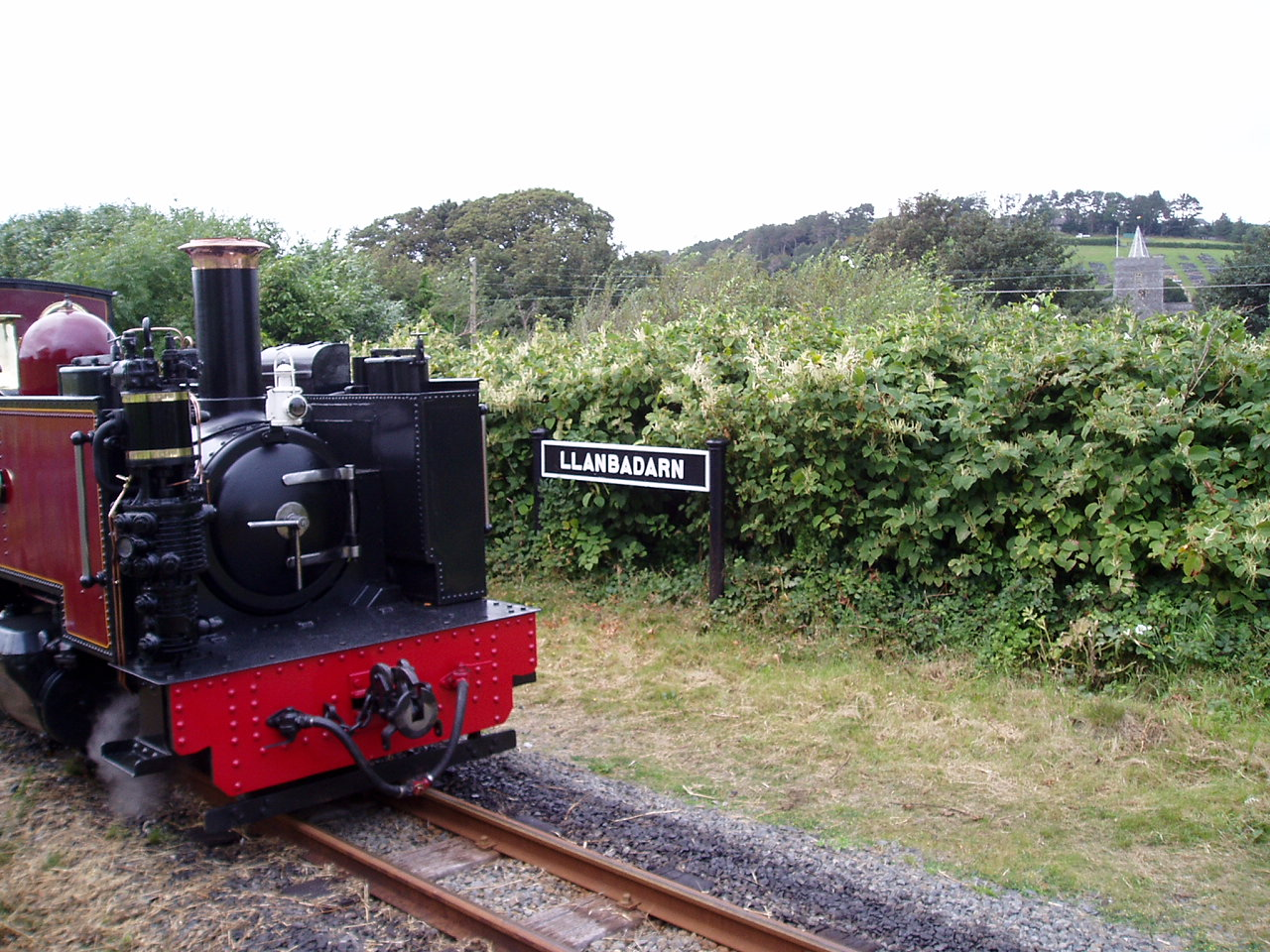
Railway leading into Llanbadarn Fawr

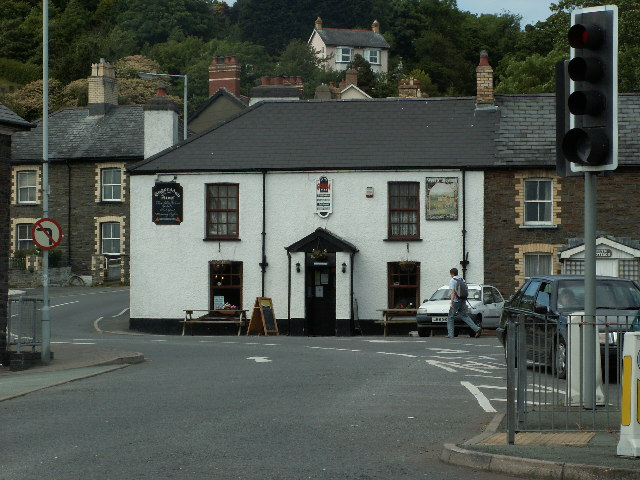
Gogerddan Arms pub

== Governance ==
Much of the community falls within the electoral wards named Llandbadarn-Fawr-Padarn and Llandadarn-Fawr-Sulien. The total population of these wards is 3,380

== Dyfi Biosphere ==
In March 2024, the town joined the Dyfi Biosphere.

== Notable people ==
- Tradition has it that the poet Dafydd ap Gwilym (ca. 1315/1320 – ca. 1350/1370) was born within Llanbadarn Fawr parish, as it stood in the fourteenth century, at Brogynin, Penrhyn-coch. He wrote about the parish church in his poem "The Girls of Llanbadarn". This church can still be visited today.
- John Rowlands (1824–1891), pen name, "Giraldus", was a Welsh antiquary and educator. He was born at Nanteos Arms.
