= Mydroilyn =

Village in Ceredigion, Wales

Coordinates: 52.17474°N 4.25823°W

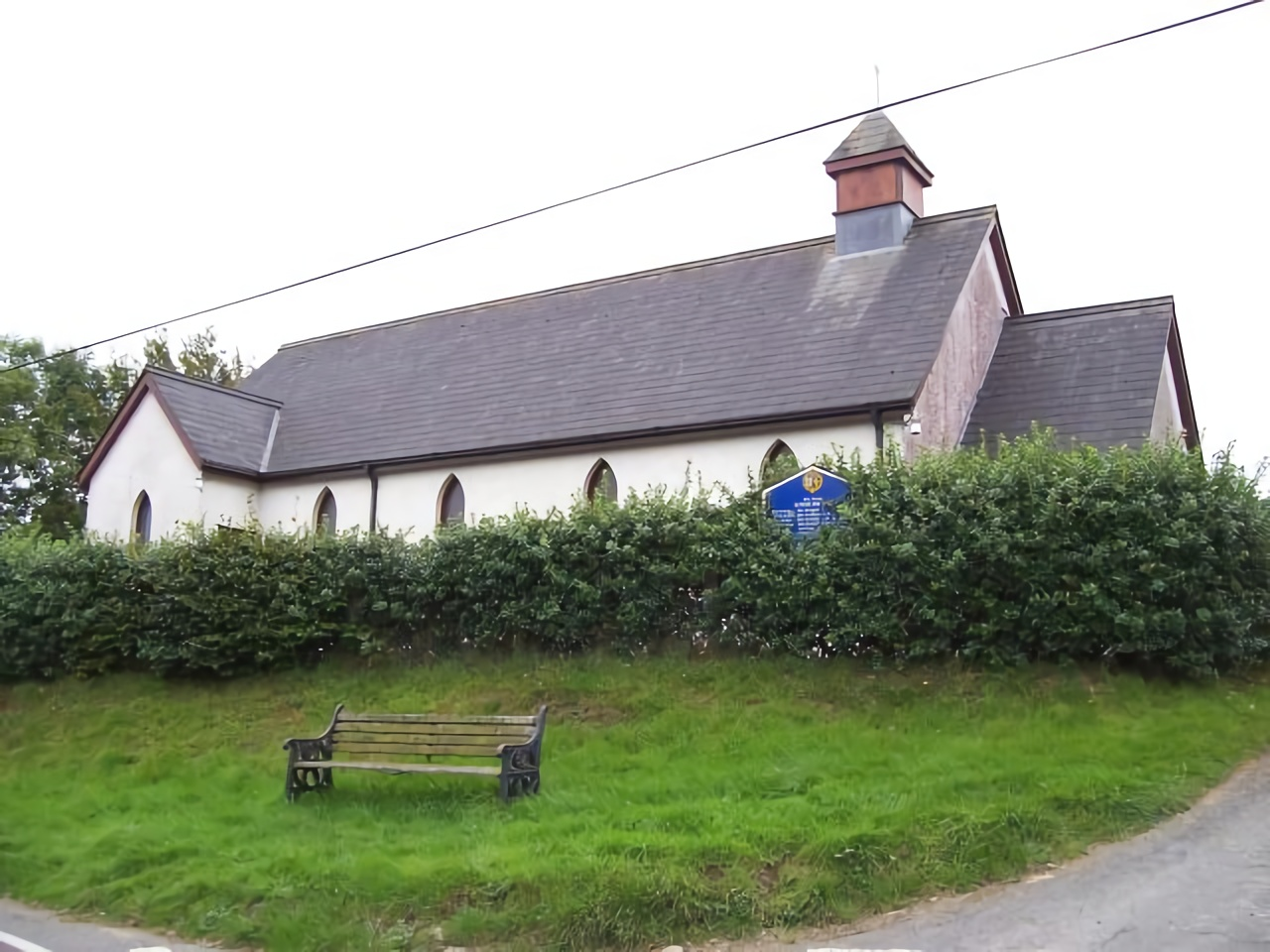
Holy Trinity Church

Mydroilyn is a village in the parish of Llanarth, Ceredigion, Wales, situated along the B4342 road.

The name of the village is derived from the confluence of the Mydr and the Oilyn; two streams in the village.

Of particular note, is the 200-year-old farmhouse Aelybryn, which once belonged to a Welsh landowner, the Anglican Holy Trinity Church, the Mydroilyn Independent Chapel, dated to 1898 by David Davies, the Y Ficar Wesleyan Chapel, dated to 1849, and the small 19th century corn-mill named Y Felin.
