= Oakford, Ceredigion =

Village in Ceredigion, Wales

Coordinates: 52.19841°N 4.26789°W

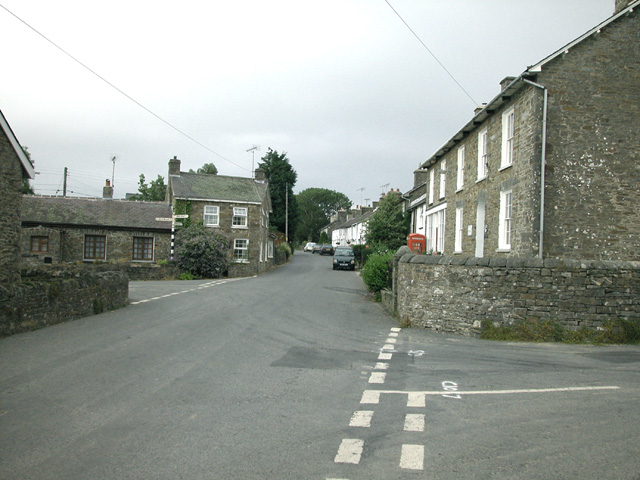

Oakford (Welsh: Derwen-gam) is a hamlet in the county of Ceredigion, Wales.

It is some 5 miles (8 km) south of the coastal town of Aberaeron.
