= Ceredigion Penfro =

Senedd constituency (from 2026)

- County multi-member constituency for the Senedd
- Boundary of Ceredigion Penfro in Wales
- Principal areas: Ceredigion; Pembrokeshire
- Preserved county: Dyfed
- Population: 198,360 (2024)
- Major settlements: Aberystwyth, Cardigan, Fishguard, Haverfordwest, Lampeter, Milford Haven, Pembroke, St Davids

Current County multi-member constituency
- Created: 2026
- Seats: 6
- Created from: UK Parliament boundaries: Ceredigion Preseli; Mid and South Pembrokeshire; Previous Senedd constituencies: Carmarthen West and South Pembrokeshire; Ceredigion; Preseli Pembrokeshire; Previous Senedd region: Mid and West Wales

Ceredigion Penfro (Welsh for 'Ceredigion [and] Pembroke';) is a six-member constituency of the Senedd (Welsh Parliament; Welsh: Senedd Cymru) used in the 2026 Senedd election. It covers the counties Ceredigion and Pembrokeshire in West Wales.

It was proposed following the 2026 review of Senedd constituencies, and is a pairing of the two UK Parliament constituencies of Ceredigion Preseli and Mid and South Pembrokeshire. Like all constituencies resulting from the 2026 review, it has a Welsh-only name.

== Boundaries ==
A Senedd constituency comprising the boundaries of the UK Parliament constituencies of Ceredigion Preseli and Mid and South Pembrokeshire, has been proposed by the Democracy and Boundary Commission Cymru for the 2026 election to the Senedd (Welsh Parliament; Senedd Cymru). It was initially proposed using the English name Ceredigion and Pembrokeshire in September 2024, but was renamed Ceredigion Penfro in December proposals with most constituencies using Welsh-only names. The Welsh-only name and boundaries were confirmed in the commission's final recommendations in March 2025. When announcing their candidates, Reform UK used "Ceredigion Preseli, Mid and South Pembrokeshire" instead, using the English names for the pair of UK Parliament constituencies that form it.

It encompasses the entire principal areas (counties) of Ceredigion and Pembrokeshire in West Wales. The constituency was established in 2026, following the passing of the Senedd Cymru (Members and Elections) Act 2024. The act legislates electoral reform of the Senedd to create 16 larger "super constituencies", pairing the 32 UK Parliament constituencies in Wales, and using a new fully proportional voting system, with each constituency electing six Members of the Senedd (MSs) rather than one previously.

== Members of the Senedd ==
Term	Election	Distribution	MS	MS	MS	MS	MS	MS
7th	2026	3 / 1 / 2	Elin Jones (PC)	Claire Archibald (Ref)	Kerry Ferguson (PC)	Paul Davies (Con)	Paul Marr (Ref)	Anna Nicholl (PC)

== Elections ==
=== Elections in the 2020s ===
2026 Senedd election: Ceredigion Penfro
Party	Candidate	Votes	%	±%
Plaid Cymru	Elin Jones (E) Kerry Ferguson (E) Anna Nicholl (E) Cris Tomos Colin Nosworthy Clive Davies Owain Jones Matt Adams	31,943	35.8	+8.9
Reform	Claire Archibald (E) Paul Marr (E) Michael Allen Elisa Randall Peter John Bernard Holton	23,003	25.8	+24.6
Conservative	Paul Davies (E) Samuel Kurtz Claire George Brian Murphy Gill Evans Claire Jones	14,789	16.6	−11.8
Labour	Eluned Morgan Marc Tierney Joshua Phillips Margaret Greenaway Tansaim Hussain-Gul Luke Davies-Jones Peter Huw Jenkins	6,495	7.3	−19.6
Green	Amy Nicholass Tomass Jerminovics James Purchase Morgan Phillips Rosie O'Toole Kezia Hine	6,324	7.1	+2.2
Liberal Democrats	Sandra Jervis Alistair Cameron Tom Hughes Lee Herring Andrew Lye Maggie Robinson	4,613	5.2	+0.3
Gwlad	Gwyn Wigley Evans	802	0.9	+0.5
Heritage	Elizabeth Davies	442	0.5	New
Independent	Aaron Carey	368	0.4	N/A
Independent	George Chadzy	286	0.3	N/A
Independent	Paul Dowson	88	0.1	N/A
Majority		8,940		
Turnout		89,153	56	+4.2
Registered electors		159,063		
Plaid Cymru win (new seat)				
Plaid Cymru win (new seat)				
Plaid Cymru win (new seat)				
Reform win (new seat)				
Reform win (new seat)				
Conservative win (new seat)				

2021 notional result (Note: Estimate of the 2021 Senedd election result as if the revised boundaries recommended under the 2026 boundary review were in place)
Party	Vote	%	Seats
Plaid Cymru	27,004	33.3	2
Conservative	23,761	29.3	2
Labour	20,350	25.1	2
Liberal Democrats	4,905	6.1	0
Reform UK	2,265	2.8	0
Green	1,356	1.7	0
UKIP	582	0.7	0
Independent	514	0.6	0
Freedom Alliance	305	0.4	0
