= Y Garn (Plynlimon) =

Mountain (684m) in Ceredigion, Wales

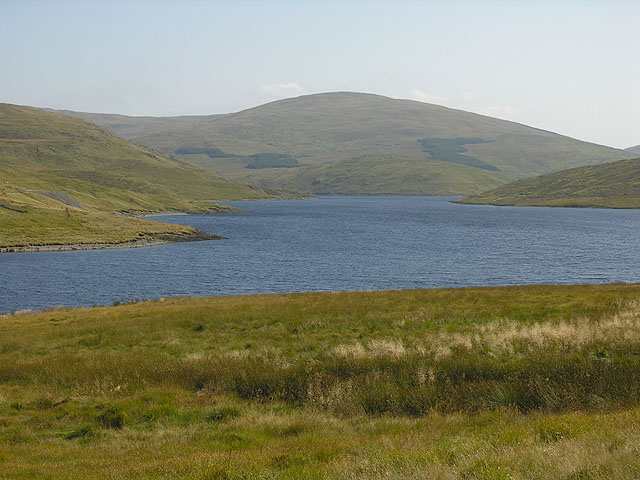
- View over Nant-y-moch Reservoir

Highest point
- Elevation: 684 m (2,244 ft)
- Prominence: 56 m (184 ft)
- Parent peak: Pen Pumlumon Fawr
- Listing: Hewitt, Nuttall
- Coordinates: 52.4505°N 3.8031°W

Naming
- Language of name: Welsh

Geography
- Location: Ceredigion, Wales
- Parent range: Cambrian Mountains
- OS grid: SN789869
- Topo map: OS Landranger 135

Y Garn is a subsidiary summit of Pen Pumlumon Fawr and the fourth highest peak on the Plynlimon massif, a part of the Cambrian Mountains in the county of Ceredigion, Wales.

The summit is marked by a large shelter cairn, hollowed out from an ancient burial cairn. The views include Rhos Fawr, Drygarn Fawr, Pen y Garn to the south and Aran Fawddwy, Glasgwm, Tarrenhendre and Tarren y Gesail to the north. The Nant-y-moch Reservoir can also be seen to the north, with the smaller summits of Drosgol at 550 m (1,800 ft) and Banc Llechwedd-mawr at 560 m (1,840 ft). both Marilyns.
