= Pen Pumlumon Arwystli =

Mountain (741m) in Ceredigion, Wales

Highest point
- Elevation: 741 m (2,431 ft)
- Prominence: 64 m (210 ft)
- Parent peak: Pen Pumlumon Fawr
- Listing: Hewitt, Nuttall
- Coordinates: 52.4750°N 3.7458°W

Naming
- Language of name: Welsh

Geography
- Location: Ceredigion, Wales
- Parent range: Cambrian Mountains
- OS grid: SN789869
- Topo map: OS Landranger 135

Pen Pumlumon Arwystli is the second highest summit on the Plynlimon massif, a part of the Cambrian Mountains in the county of Ceredigion, Wales.

The summit is grassy, and is marked by 3 large ancient cairns. The views include Rhos Fawr, Drygarn Fawr, Pen y Garn to the south and Aran Fawddwy, Glasgwm, Tarrenhendre and Tarren y Gesail to the north.

The longest river in Britain, the River Severn, has its source on a lower boggy plateau to the north of the summit.

== See also ==
- Arwystli
