= Pen Pumlumon Llygad-bychan =

Mountain (727m) in Ceredigion, Wales

Highest point
- Elevation: 727 m (2,385 ft)
- Prominence: 36 m (118 ft)
- Parent peak: Pen Pumlumon Fawr
- Listing: Hewitt, Nuttall
- Coordinates: 52.4691°N 3.7694°W

Naming
- Language of name: Welsh

Geography
- Location: Ceredigion, Wales
- Parent range: Cambrian Mountains
- OS grid: SN799871
- Topo map: OS Landranger 135

Pen Pumlumon Llygad-bychan is a subsidiary summit of Pen Pumlumon Fawr and the third highest summit on the Plynlimon massif, a part of the Cambrian Mountains in the county of Ceredigion, Wales. It is not named on Ordnance Survey walking maps.

The summit is boggy, and is marked by a few stones. The views include Rhos Fawr, Drygarn Fawr, Pen y Garn to the south and Aran Fawddwy, Glasgwm, Tarrenhendre and Tarren y Gesail to the north.

The River Wye, has its source just south of the summit. The glacial lake of Llyn Llygad Rheidiol lies to the north.
