= Y Glog (mountain) =

Hill (574m) in Ceredigion, Wales

Y Glog or Draws Drum

Highest point
- Elevation: 574 m (1,883 ft)
- Prominence: 106 m (348 ft)
- Parent peak: Pumlumon Fawr
- Listing: HuMP
- Coordinates: 52°24′43″N 3°46′46″W

Geography
- Location: Cambrian Mountains
- OS grid: SN790811

Y Glog or Draws Drum is a mountain situated in Ceredigion, Wales. It stands at an elevation of 574 metres (1883 feet) above sea level and is located a few miles south of Plynlimon (Pumlumon), north of Pen y Garn, and just south of the A44 road. The mountain is classified as a HuMP, denoting its prominence. It is situated in a region characterized by desolate moorland, which is home to the Cefn Croes Wind Farm and the nearby small lakes known as Llynoedd Ieuan.
