= Bache Hill =

Mountain in Powys, Wales

- Bryn Bach
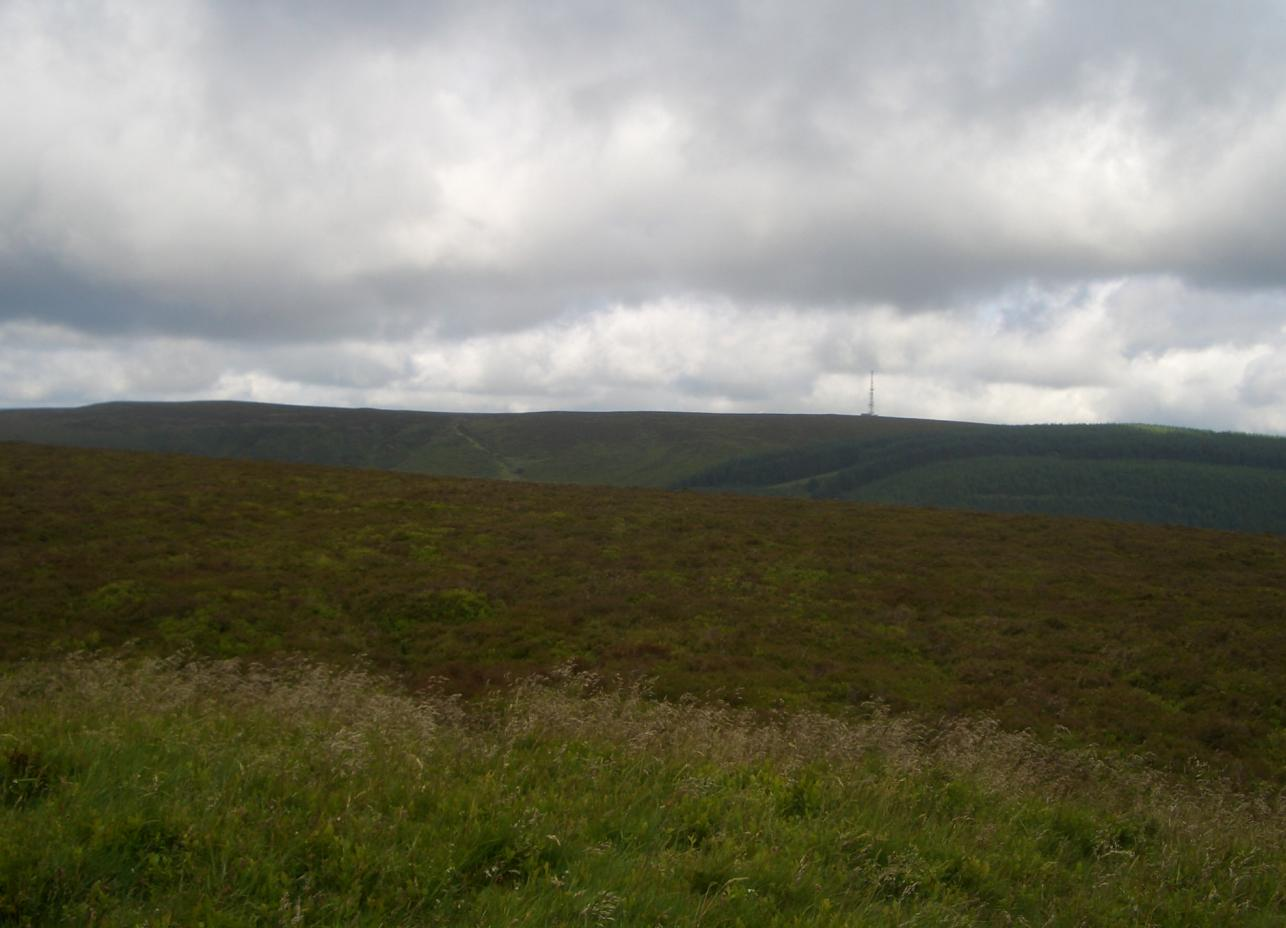
- Black Mixen from Bache Hill summit

Highest point
- Elevation: 610 m (2,000 ft)
- Prominence: 41 m (135 ft)
- Parent peak: Rhos Fawr
- Listing: Hewitt, Nuttall,
- Coordinates: 52.2653°N 3.1533°W

Geography
- Location: Powys, Wales
- Parent range: Cambrian Mountains
- OS grid: SO182639
- Topo map: OS Landranger 148

Bache Hill (Welsh: Bryn Bach) is a subsidiary summit of Rhos Fawr or Great Rhos, in the Radnor Forest in Wales. It is located to the east of Black Mixen. The summit is marked by a trig point built on an ancient burial mound, probably of Bronze Age date, like most of the summit cairns and round barrows in Wales.

Some controversy arises from the burial mound; in that 610 metres might be the top of the man-made mound. Some walkers therefore doubt Bache Hill's 2,000-foot status. However, the latest OS Explorer Maps shows a large 610-metre contour round the summit.
