= Pen y Garn =

Mountain (611m) in Ceredigion

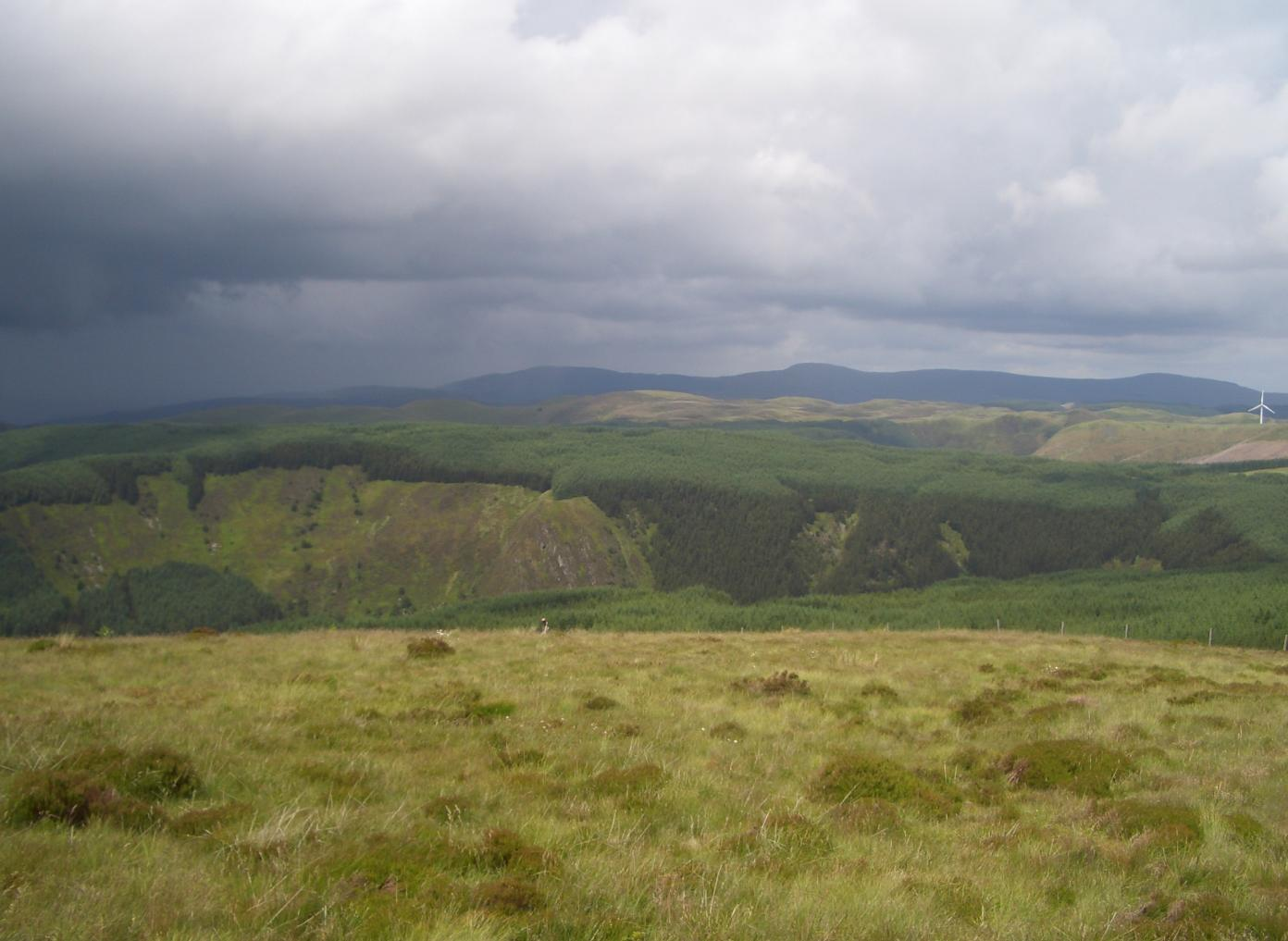
- The Nant Rhuddnant gorge looking north to Cefn Croes from the summit of Pen y Garn. In the background is Y Garn (left), Pen Pumlumon Fawr and Pen Pumlumon Arwystli (right)

Highest point
- Elevation: 611 m (2,005 ft)
- Prominence: 194 m (636 ft)
- Parent peak: Plynlimon
- Listing: Marilyn, Hewitt, Nuttall
- Coordinates: 52.3785°N 3.7666°W

Naming
- Language of name: Welsh

Geography
- Location: Ceredigion, Wales
- Parent range: Cambrian Mountains
- OS grid: SN798771
- Topo map: OS Landranger 147 or 135

Pen y Garn (head of the cairn) is a mountain in the Cambrian Mountains, Mid Wales standing at 611 metres above sea level.

Pen y Garn tops a 500–600 m high plateau, which includes the controversial Cefn Croes wind farm. The summit has a very large shelter cairn hollowed out from the remains of an ancient burial cairn and a trig point. The wind turbines are very near the summit. To the north some 10 km, the whole Plynlimon range can be seen, including the summits of Y Garn, Pen Pumlumon Fawr, Pen Pumlumon Llygad-bychan and Pen Pumlumon Arwystli. 21 km to the west is the town of Aberystwyth; Drygarn Fawr lies 20 km to the SSE .
