= Siambr =

Siambr or Y Siambr [transl. (the) chamber] may refer to:

- Y Siambr, the Welsh Parliament or Senedd's debating chamber
  - Tŷ Hywel (Siambr Hywel), its former, now youth, chamber
- Y Siambr (TV series), an S4C game show
- Any chambered cairn in Wales
- Siambr Trawsfynydd, a mountain in West Wales
