= Black Mixen =

Mountain in Powys, Wales

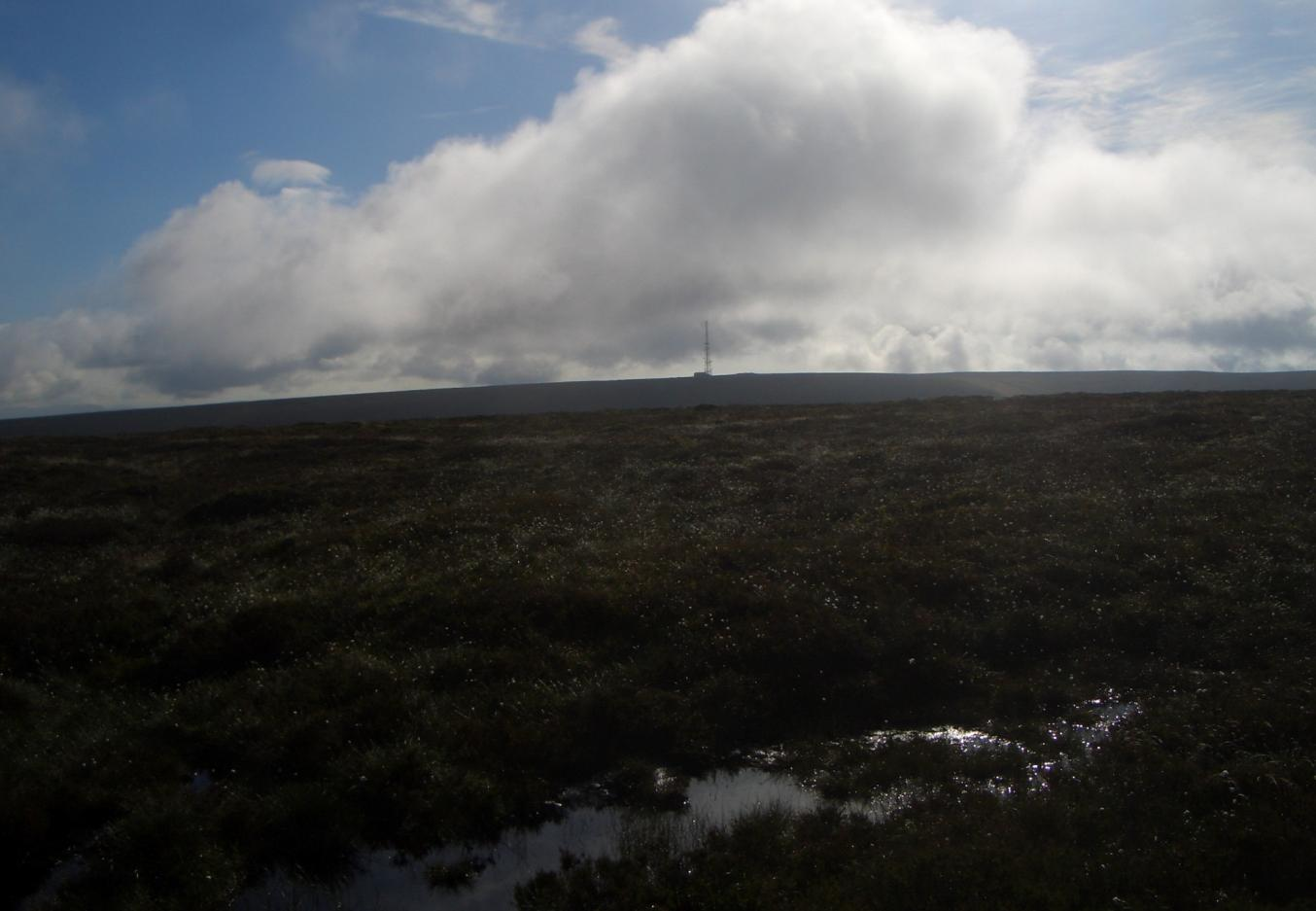
- Black Mixen and the communications mast from the Rhos Fawr plateau

Highest point
- Elevation: 650 m (2,130 ft)
- Prominence: 45 m (148 ft)
- Parent peak: Rhos Fawr
- Listing: Hewitt, Nuttall,
- Coordinates: 52.2718°N 3.1789°W

Geography
- Location: Powys, Wales
- Parent range: Cambrian Mountains
- OS grid: SO182639
- Topo map: OS Landranger 148

Black Mixen (Welsh: Y Domen Ddu) is a subsidiary summit of Rhos Fawr or Great Rhos in the Radnor Forest. The summit is large peat bog plateau. The summit is marked with a cairn, and is next to a radio transmitter and its building.

Black Mixen is the only Nuttall to have a communications mast (a radio transmitter) on its summit. To the east is Bache Hill, to the south are the Black Mountains, to the west is the Great Rhos plateau.

The summit cairn is probably of Bronze Age date, with most peaks in the area showing similar barrowss.
