= Cascob =

Village in Powys, Wales

Coordinates: 52°17′N 3°07′W

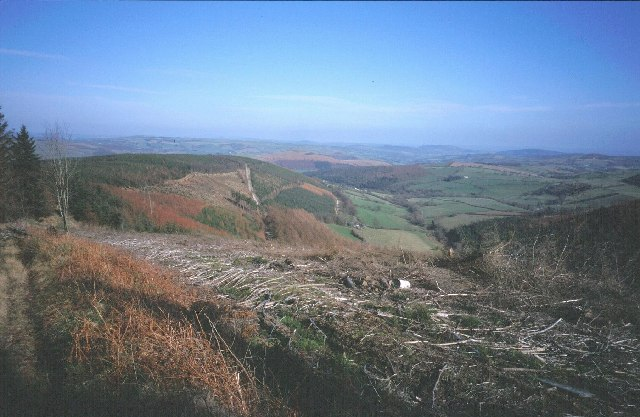
Cascob Valley from Radnor Forest.

Cascob (Welsh: Casgob) is a small village in Powys. It is located in a valley five miles to the south-west of Knighton. The village is part of Whitton, Powys. The village is situated to the east of Radnor Forest, an area of moorland just within Wales. It also lies to the north-west of the small border town of Kington.

In 1086, when the Domesday Book was compiled, Cascob was listed with no recorded population but within the hundred of Leintwardine. Additionally, it was counted under both Herefordshire and Shropshire.

Until 1983 Cascob was a community.
