= Gorllwyn =

Mountain (613m) in Powys, Wales

Coordinates: 52.21203°N 3.66698°W

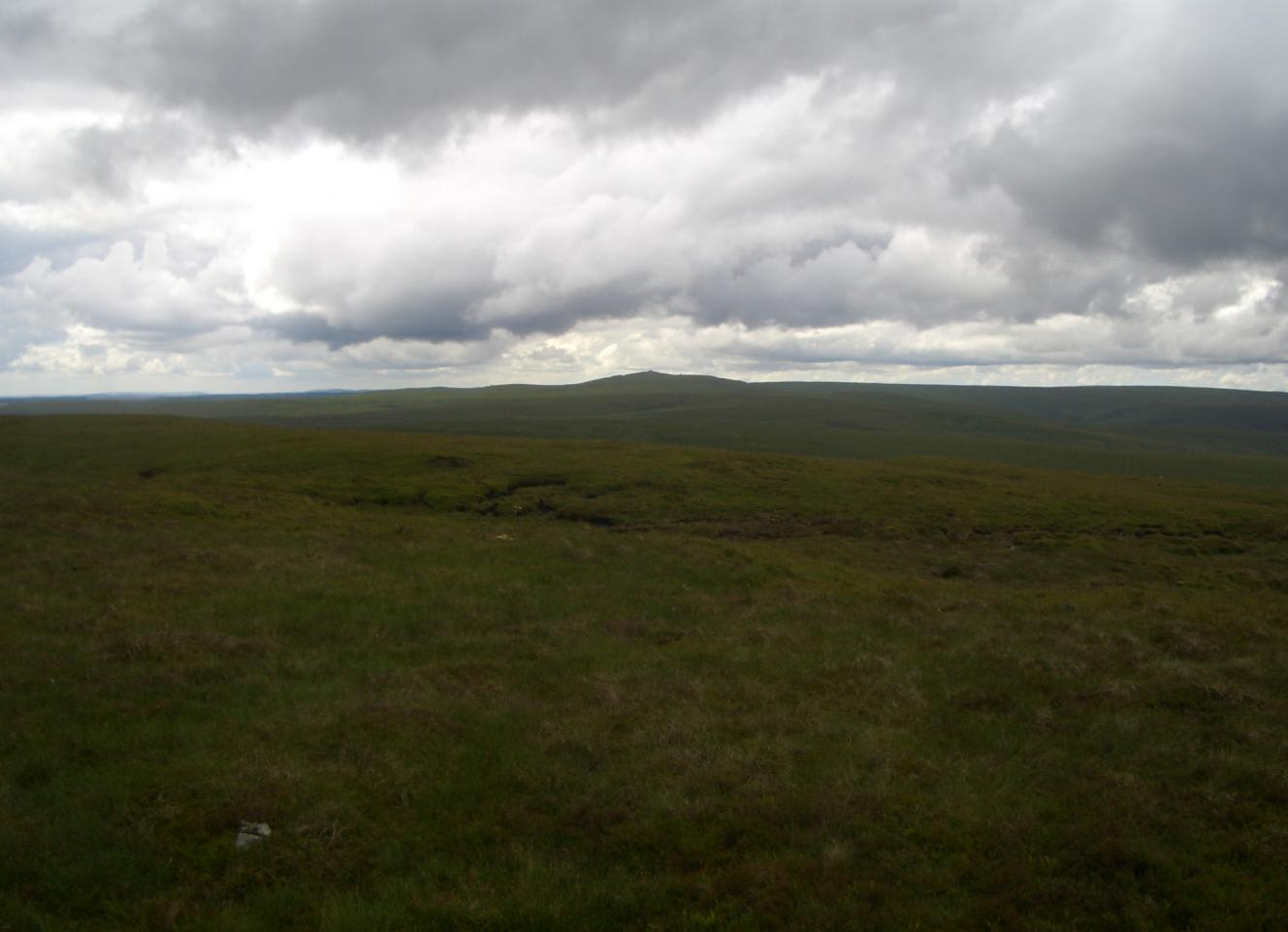
- Drygarn Fawr from the Gorllwyn plateau

Highest point
- Elevation: 613 m (2,011 ft)
- Prominence: 88 m (289 ft)
- Parent peak: Drygarn Fawr
- Listing: Hewitt, Nuttall

Naming
- Language of name: Welsh

Geography
- Location: Powys, Wales
- Parent range: Cambrian Mountains
- OS grid: SN862584
- Topo map: OS Landranger 147

Gorllwyn is a subsidiary summit of Drygarn Fawr, located on a remote moorland plateau of the Cambrian Mountains. The summit is grassy and is surrounded by peat bog. There is a shelter cairn and a trig point.

To the west is Drygarn Fawr, its large cairns making it a very distinctive feature in an otherwise featureless plateau. Drygarn Fawr is separated from Gorllwyn by the pass of Bwlch y Ddau Faen. To the east the plateau continues towards Y Gamriw. Radnor Forest lies further to the east.
