= Flag of Ceredigion =

De facto civil flag

- Use: Civil flag
- Proportion: 3:5
- Adopted: Historical
- Design: Sable a Lion rampant reguardant Or

The flag of Ceredigion is the de facto flag of Ceredigion (previously Cardiganshire), Wales. The earliest source referring to the flag dates back to 1611. The flag enjoys widespread usage throughout the county.

== History ==
=== Early history ===
The design of the flag is thought to have derived from the arms of the ancient Welsh ruler Gwaithfoed of Ceredigion, which depicted a black lion on a field of gold.

The earliest source relating to the flag can be found in John Guillim's 1611 work A Display of Heraldry which described a black lion on a yellow background belonging to “Gwaythe Voyde, sometime Lord of Cardigan in Wales”. A similar reference to the design is noted in 1878 in The General Armory of England, Scotland, Ireland, and Wales by Sir Bernard Burke.

A black lion on a yellow field is also featured on a monument to Lewis Pryse, grandfather of Pryse Pryse, at St. Padarn's Church, Llanbadarn Fawr, on the outskirts of Aberystwyth.

The relationship between the black lion on a yellow field and the influential Pryse family led to a greater adoption of the flag in the surrounding area. For example, a pub in Aberystwyth has been named 'The Black Lion' since 1851.

An extract from the 1894 work of Arthur Charles Fox-Davies and M. E. B. Crookes, The Book of Public Arms, describes the county of Cardigan as possessing no official arms, yet states that the local population of Aberystwyth recognise the "lion rampant regardant" as being the arms of the town.

=== Modern history ===
Coat of arms of the former Cardiganshire County Council, as well as the current Ceredigion County Council.

The significance of the lion rampant regardant to Cardiganshire led to its inclusion as the sinister supporter alongside the red dragon of Wales on the coat of arms of Aberystwyth, awarded in 1961.

The sable lion rampant regardant on an or field also featured at the 1969 investiture of Prince Charles at Caernarfon Castle.

With the symbol firmly entrenched in the society and culture of the county, its inclusion in the arms awarded to Cardiganshire County Council and later to its successor Ceredigion County Council was a natural choice. However, the colours were reversed as to not usurp the Pryse's family insignia. The administration of Dyfed also included the reverse colours of the symbol on their coat of arms to symbolise the inclusion of Cardiganshire within its territory.

By the late 20th century, the adoption of the reversed colours of the symbol allowed for it to be distinguished from the arms of Pryse family and had come to represent the county in its own right. The yellow lion on a black field can be found flying in settlements throughout Ceredigion, and has been used by multiple establishments in the county, such as Aberystwyth Rugby Club and Ysgol Penglais School.

Yet, as of 2023 the flag has not officially been recognised as the flag of Cardiganshire by the Flag Institute.

== Design ==
The flag depicts a lion 'rampant regardant' (looking backwards) or on a field sable.
