= Llan Ddu Fawr =

Hill (594m) in Ceredigion, Wales

Coordinates: 52.3145°N 3.7800°W

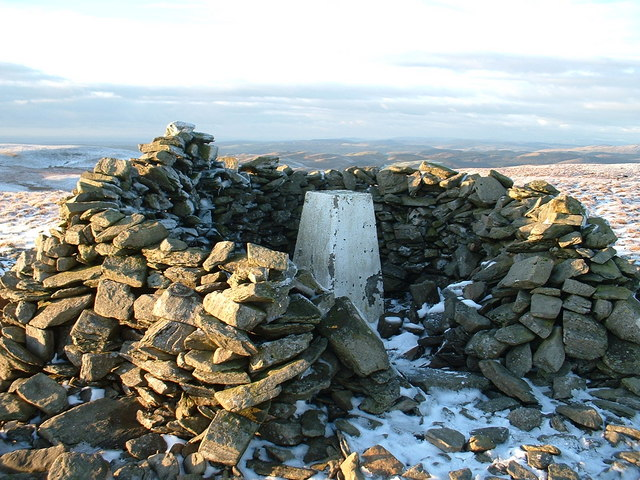
- Llan Ddu Fawr summit

Highest point
- Elevation: 594 m (1,949 ft)
- Prominence: 168 m (551 ft)
- Parent peak: Pumlumon
- Listing: Marilyn

Geography
- Location: Ceredigion
- OS grid: SN790704

Llan Ddu Fawr or Waun Claerddu is a hill located in Ceredigion, Wales, at 594 metres (1,949 ft) above sea level. It is located about 10 miles south of Pumlumon. The surrounding land can be very boggy. There is a trig point at the summit, but this is not the highest point. There is also a cairn of about 15 meters in diameter. The peak is located within the region known as the Desert of Wales.
