= Desert of Wales =

Undeveloped area of Wales

Coordinates: 52.310644°N 3.721662°W

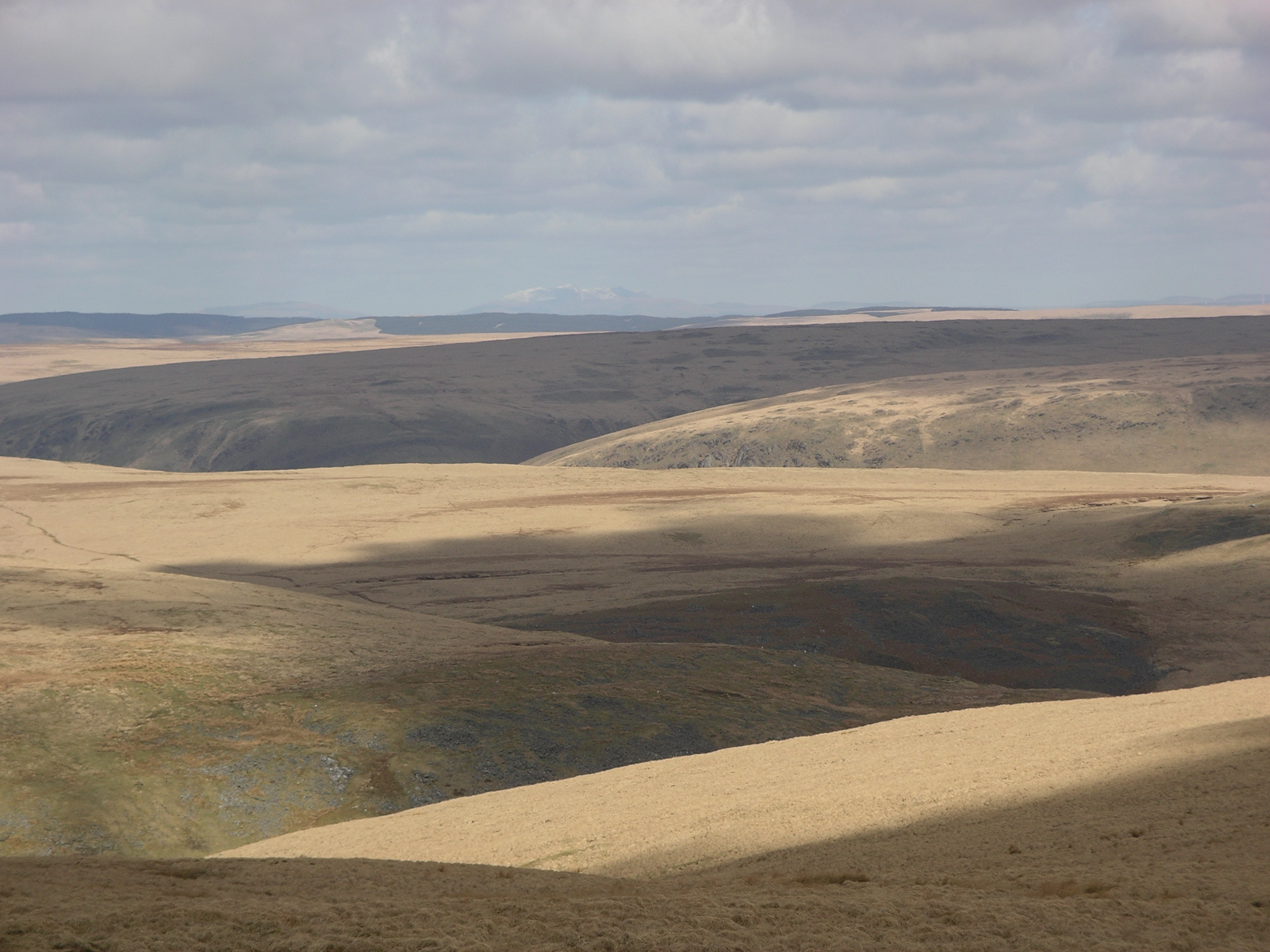
The Desert of Wales seen from Drygarn Fawr

The Desert of Wales, or Green Desert of Wales, is an archaic term for an area in central Wales, so called for its lack of roads and towns, and its inaccessibility. The term was coined by English travel writers in the nineteenth century and has no equivalent in the Welsh language. The area corresponds roughly to the upland area called Elenydd in Welsh.

== Extent ==
The word "desert" is used figuratively, to describe the lack of biodiversity due to overgrazing of sheep and human clearing, which, over time, has destroyed the native temperate rainforest, and the lack of human settlement or infrastructure in the region. The area has high rainfall and much of it is covered by peat overlain with purple moor grass and heather moorland, or by plantations of non-native conifers. The soil tends to be acidic. There is no exact definition of the extent of the Desert of Wales, but it is bordered to the east by the A470 and the town of Rhayader, to the south by the A483 from Builth Wells to Llanwrda, to the west by the A482 from Llanwrda to Pumpsaint, and from there northwards by a series of country roads up to Tregaron. The northern boundary is generally taken to be the A44 between Ponterwyd and Llangurig, although the substantial area of moorland to the north of this road, including the reservoirs of Nant y Moch and Llyn Clywedog, has similar topography.

The term 'Cambrian Desert' is also used to describe the region.

== History ==
The term was first recorded in 1836 when the following was written by Joseph Downes:

Affording us water and trees, and yielding a dim and remote picture, wrapped in purple sunset haze, of some fine country far far down, where a chasm of hills gave egress to the water, it appeared quite an oasis to us travellers of this Desert of Wales.

The English terminology has no Welsh equivalent, although the area roughly corresponds to the ancient commote of Elenydd. This Welsh name means the "territory adjoining the river Elan", with the river name itself meaning fawn or hind. Travel is limited to narrow roads, forestry tracks, footpaths and bridleways. It is a sparsely populated area, consisting largely of rolling hills, gorges and steep valleys with ancient native Welsh oak forest.

=== Ruins ===
The ruins of Strata Florida Abbey are located on the road from Tregaron.

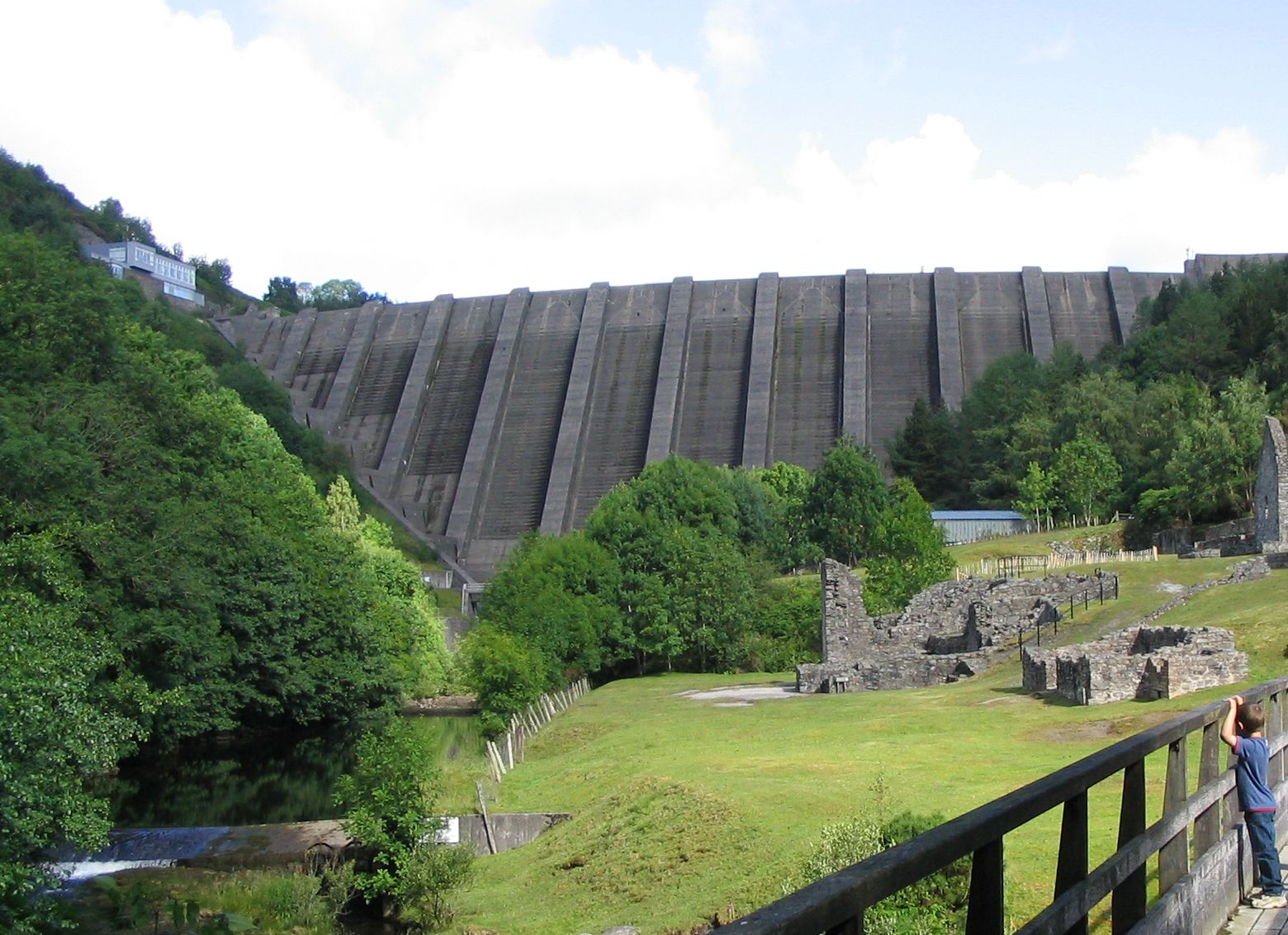
Below Clywedog reservoir dam

== Wildlife ==
The area supported the last native red kites in the United Kingdom until their reintroduction and widespread revival in the 1980s.

== Water resources ==
The area has many lakes and reservoirs, some of which supply drinking water to north Ceredigion from Teifi Pools, to the English West Midlands from Elan Valley group of reservoirs, and to populations along the River Severn valley with water stored in Llyn Clywedog and released into the river for later abstraction.

=== Drainage ===
It is drained by the Afon Claerwen, Afon Teifi, Afon Cothi, Afon Tywi, Afon Irfon, Elan Valley, Afon Gwy, Afon Ystwyth, Afon Mynach and Afon Rheidol.

== See also ==
- Elenydd
