= List of schools in Ceredigion =

This is a list of schools in Ceredigion in Wales.

== Primary schools ==
- Aberaeron Primary School
- Aberporth Primary School
- Beulah Primary School
- Cardigan Primary School
- Cenarth Primary School
- Cilcennin Primary School
- Ciliau Parc Primary School
- Coedybryn Primary School
- Comins Coch Primary School
- Craig Yr Wylfa Primary School
- Cwmpadarn Primary School
- Cwrtnewydd Primary School
- Dihewyd Primary School
- Felinfach Primary School
- Llanafan Primary School
- Llanarth Primary School
- Llanddewi Brefi Primary School
- Llandysul Primary School
- Llanfarian Primary School
- Llanfihangel-Y-Creuddyn Primary School
- Llangwyryfon Primary School
- Llangynfelyn Primary School
- Llanilar Primary School
- Llannon Primary School
- Llanwenog Primary School
- Llanwnnen Primary School
- Llechryd Primary School
- Llwyn Yr Eos Primary School
- Myfenydd Primary School
- Mynach Primary School
- New Quay Primary School
- Penllwyn Primary School
- Penparc Primary School
- Penrhyncoch Primary School
- Plascrug Primary School
- Pontrhydfendigaid Primary School
- Pontsiân Primary School
- Rhos Helyg Primary School
- Rhydypennau Primary School
- St Padarn Primary School
- Syr John Rhys Primary School
- Talgarreg Primary School
- Talybont Primary School
- Tregaron Primary School
- Trewen Primary School
- Ysgol Bro Pedr
- Ysgol Bro Sion Cwilt
- Ysgol Gymraeg Aberystwyth
- Ysgol Gynradd Gymraeg
- Ysgol T. Llew Jones
- Ysgol-Y-Dderi Primary School

== Secondary schools ==
- Ysgol Gyfun Aberaeron
- Ysgol Gyfun Gymunedol Penweddig
- Ysgol Penglais School
- Ysgol Uwchradd Aberteifi

== All-age schools ==
- Ysgol Bro Pedr
- Ysgol Bro Teifi
- Ysgol Henry Richard

== Further Education colleges ==
- Coleg Ceredigion
