= Rhos Fawr =

Mountain (660m) in Powys, Wales

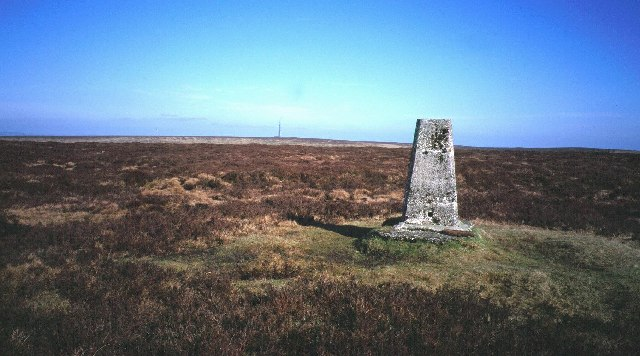
- The summit plateau of Rhos Fawr

Highest point
- Elevation: 660 m (2,170 ft)
- Prominence: 379 m (1,243 ft)
- Parent peak: Plynlimon
- Listing: Marilyn, Hewitt, Nuttall, county top (Radnorshire)
- Coordinates: 52.2671°N 3.1998°W

Geography
- Location: Powys, Wales, historic county Radnorshire
- Parent range: Cambrian Mountains
- OS grid: SO182639
- Topo map: OS Landranger 148

Listed summits of Rhos Fawr
Name	Grid ref	Height	Status
Black Mixen	SO196643	650 metres (2,133 ft)	Hewitt, Nuttall
Bache Hill	SO213636	610 metres (2,001 ft)	Hewitt, Nuttall
Whimble	SO205626	599 metres (1,965 ft)	Dewey, Dodd (hill)
Great Creigiau	SO198636	646 metres (2,119 ft)	Buxton & Lewis

Rhos Fawr is a mountain summit in the Radnor Forest (Mid Wales), a rather isolated dome of hills to the north of the village of New Radnor. The local rocks are sedimentary shales and mudstones with some Silurian limestone. With a height of 660 metres (2,170 ft), it is the highest point in the Radnor Forest and the historic county top of Radnorshire.

The summit is located on a broad heathery plateau, which is separated from Black Mixen: the eastern plateau summit, by the cwm of Harvey Dingle. To the west is Drygarn Fawr and Gorllwyn, to the northwest Plynlimon, to the north Beacon Hill and the Clun Forest (Shropshire), and to the south the Black Mountains. There is a prominent trig point at the summit, and a very useful landmark for walkers on the broad and featureless summit plateau.
