= Cefn Croes Wind Farm =

Wind farm in Wales

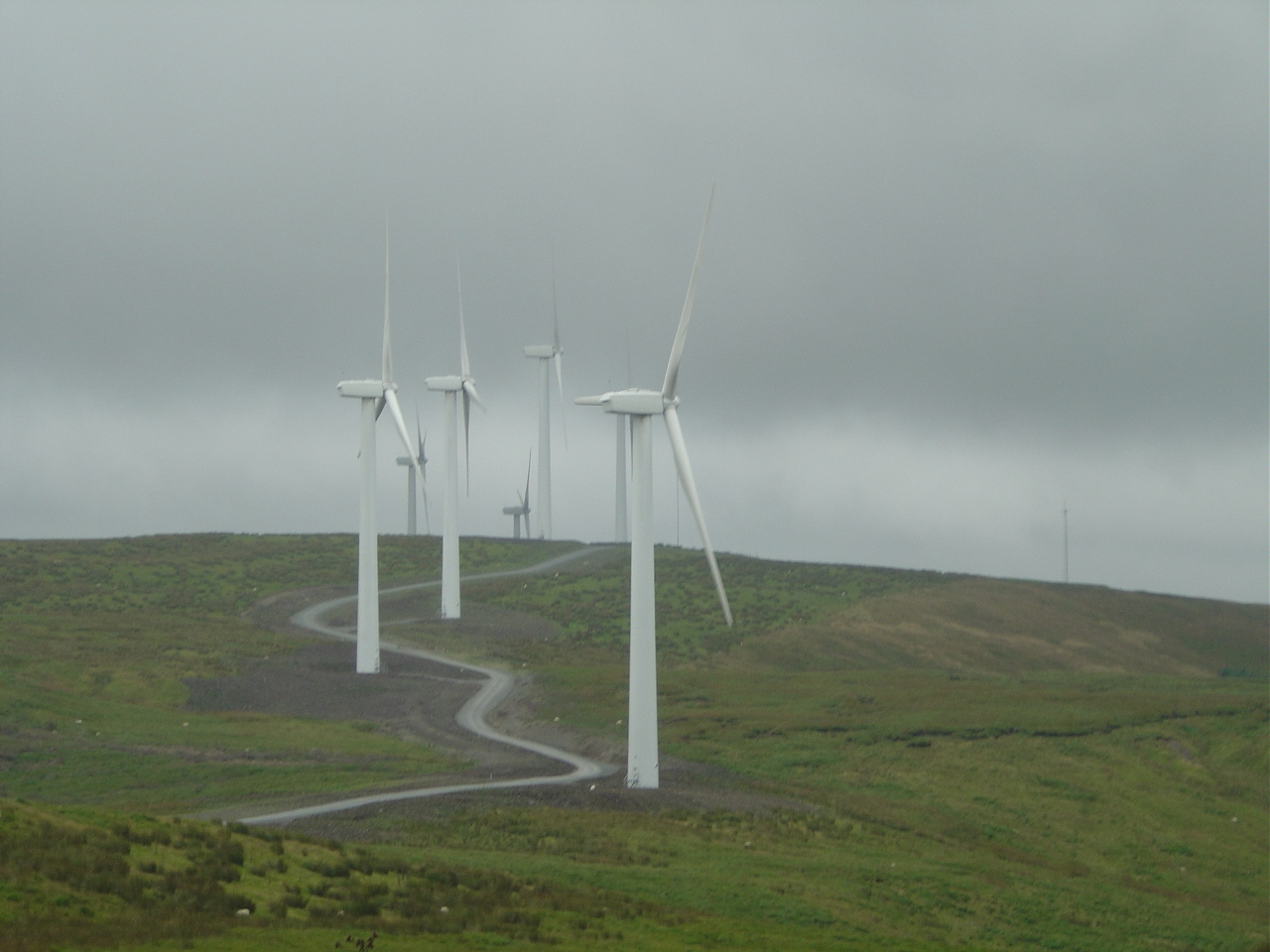
- The wind farm near its completion
- Country: Wales
- Location: near Devil's Bridge, Ceredigion
- Coordinates: 52°24′18″N 3°45′03″W
- Status: Operational
- Commission date: June 2005
- Owner: Falck Renewables

Wind farm
- Type: Onshore
- Site area: 7.5 km^{2} (2.9 sq mi)

Power generation
- Units operational: 39 x 1.5 MW
- Make and model: GE Wind 1.5MW
- Nameplate capacity: 58.5 MW

External links
- Commons: Related media on Commons

Cefn Croes is a wind farm in Ceredigion, Wales. It is located in the Cambrian Mountains on Cefn Croes mountain, 573m (1,880 ft) south of the A44 road between Aberystwyth and Llangurig, in west Wales. The construction of the wind farm commenced in February 2004, and was completed in the spring of 2005 when the 39 wind turbines started producing electricity. Economic Development Minister Andrew Davies opened the windfarm in 2005. The maximum installed nameplate capacity is 58.5 MW.

Community development contributions from the operator of the windfarm are divided between Pontarfynach and Blaenrheidol community councils.

Nearby is the HuMP Y Glog (Draws Drum).
