= Nant-y-moch Reservoir =

Reservoir in Ceredigion, Wales

Nant y Moch
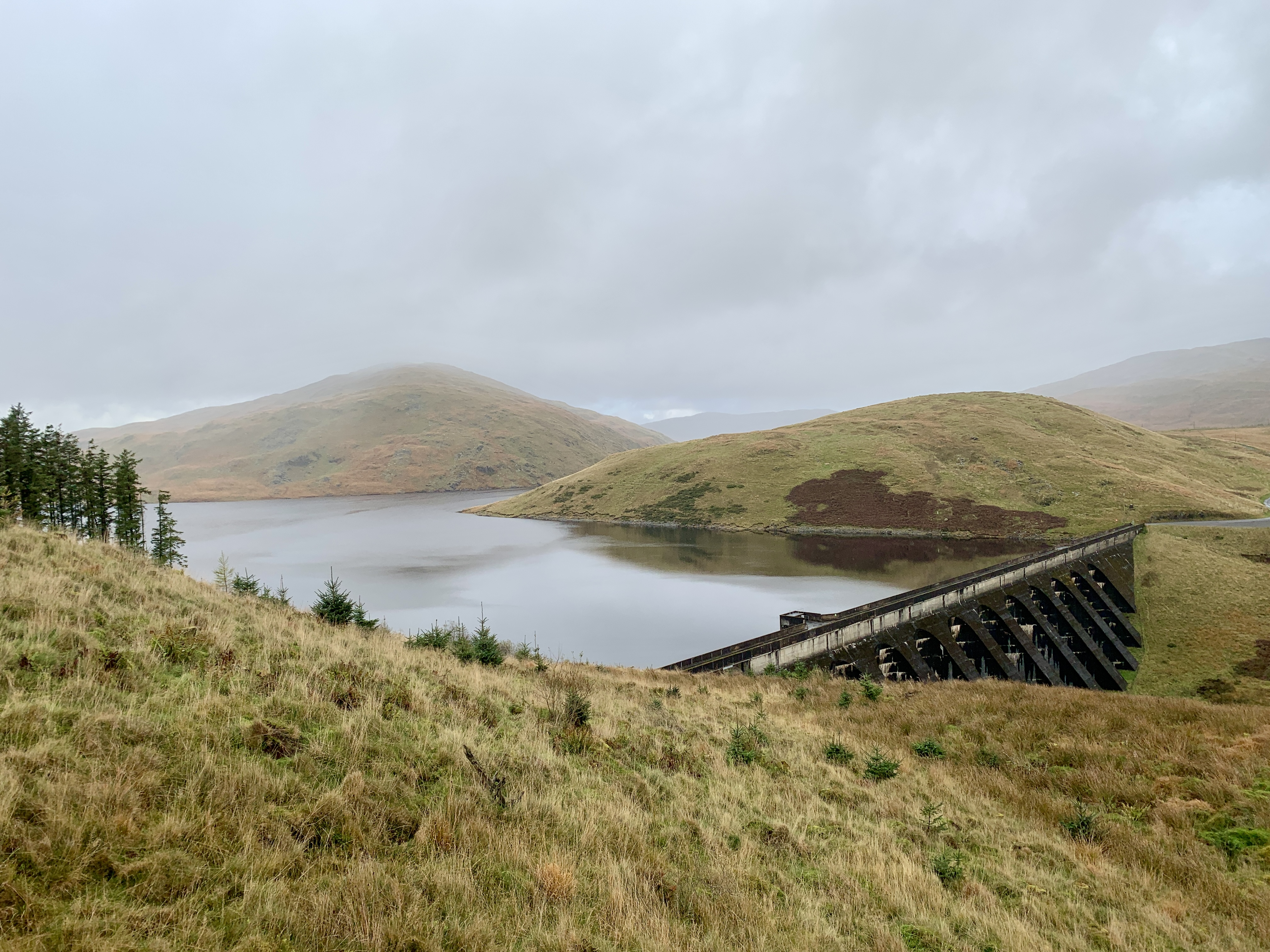
- dam spillway

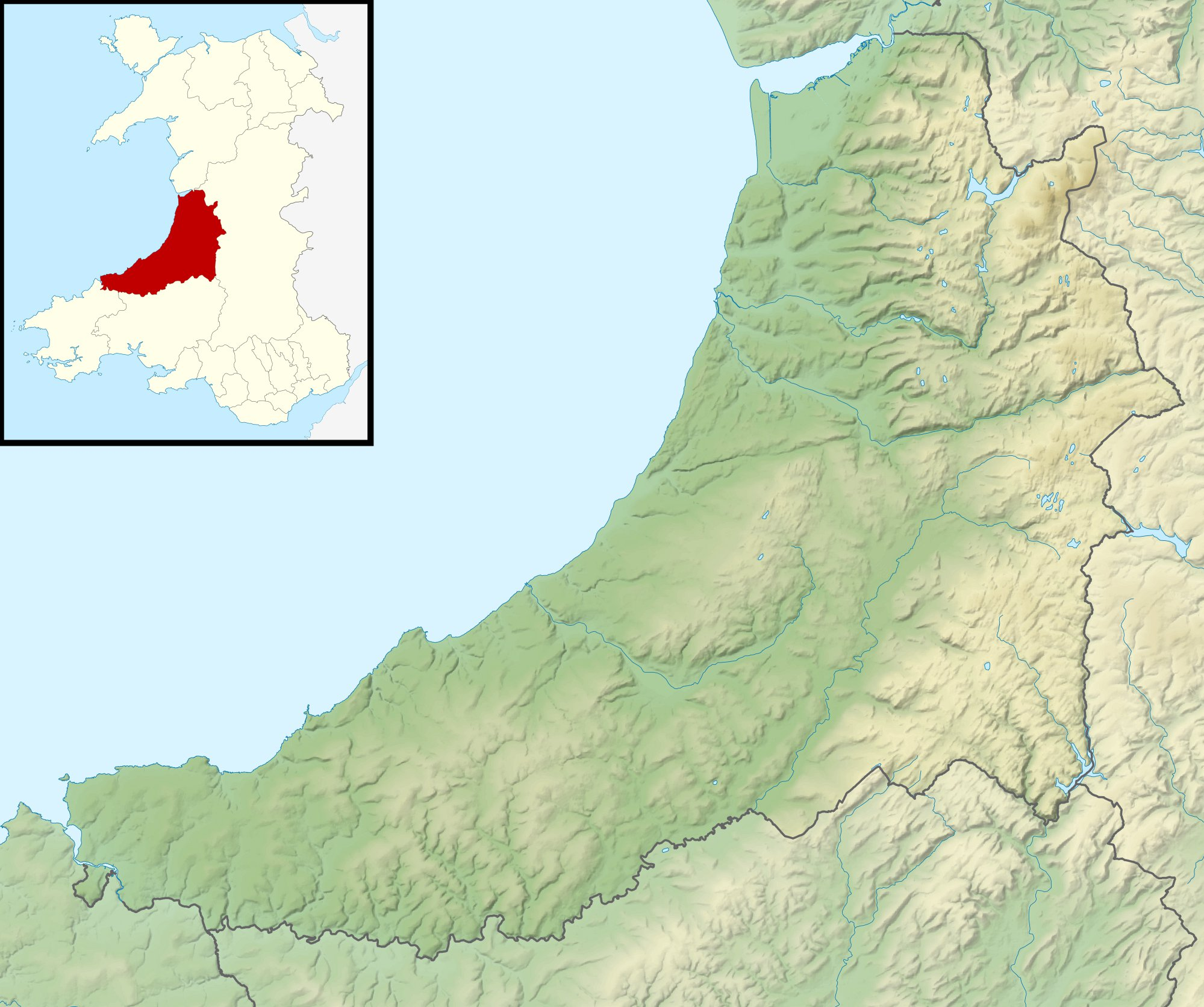
- Location within Ceredigion
- Location: Cambrian Mountains, Wales
- Coordinates: 52°28′5″N 3°50′22″W
- Type: reservoir
- Basin countries: United Kingdom
- Surface area: 525 acres (212 ha)

Nant-y-moch Reservoir (Welsh pronunciation) is situated in the Cambrian Mountains in northern Ceredigion, Wales, near Pumlumon. The reservoir which flooded a part of the valley of the River Rheidol and its headwaters derives its name from a stream, the Nant-y-moch (in English = the pigs stream,), which formerly flowed into the River Rheidol at this spot. The dam is about three miles north of the village of Ponterwyd. The reservoir forms part of the Cwm Rheidol hydroelectric power scheme and the headwaters of the reservoir include the source of the River Rheidol. The Nant-y-moch component of the hydroelectric scheme has an installed capacity of 13 MW generated as the water from Nant-y-moch enters Dinas Reservoir.

== History ==
Nant-y-moch Reservoir was created in 1964. The construction of the dam flooded the valley north of it, which included the hamlet of Nant-y-moch. The contents of the graveyard which was to be submerged were relocated to the chapel at Ponterwyd, and a number of cairns were painstakingly moved, some of which dated back as far as the Iron Age.
