= Cambrian Mountains =

Series of mountain ranges in Wales

Coordinates: 52°25′N 3°30′W

- Mynyddoedd Cambria (Welsh)
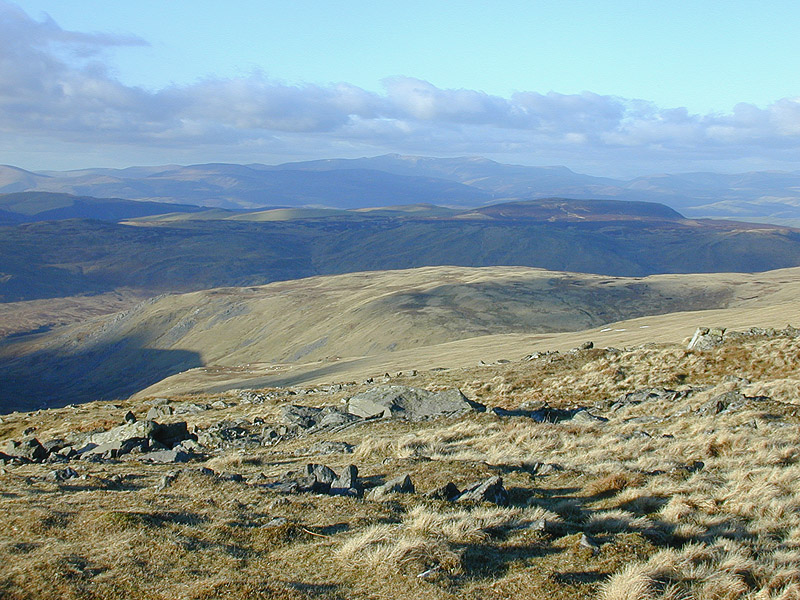
- Northern view from Pen Pumlumon Arwystli

Highest point
- Peak: Plynlimon
- Elevation: 752 m (2,467 ft)

Geography
- Location within Wales
- Countries: Wales, United Kingdom

Geology
- Rock age(s): Ordovician and Silurian
- Rock type(s): Sandstone and Mudstone

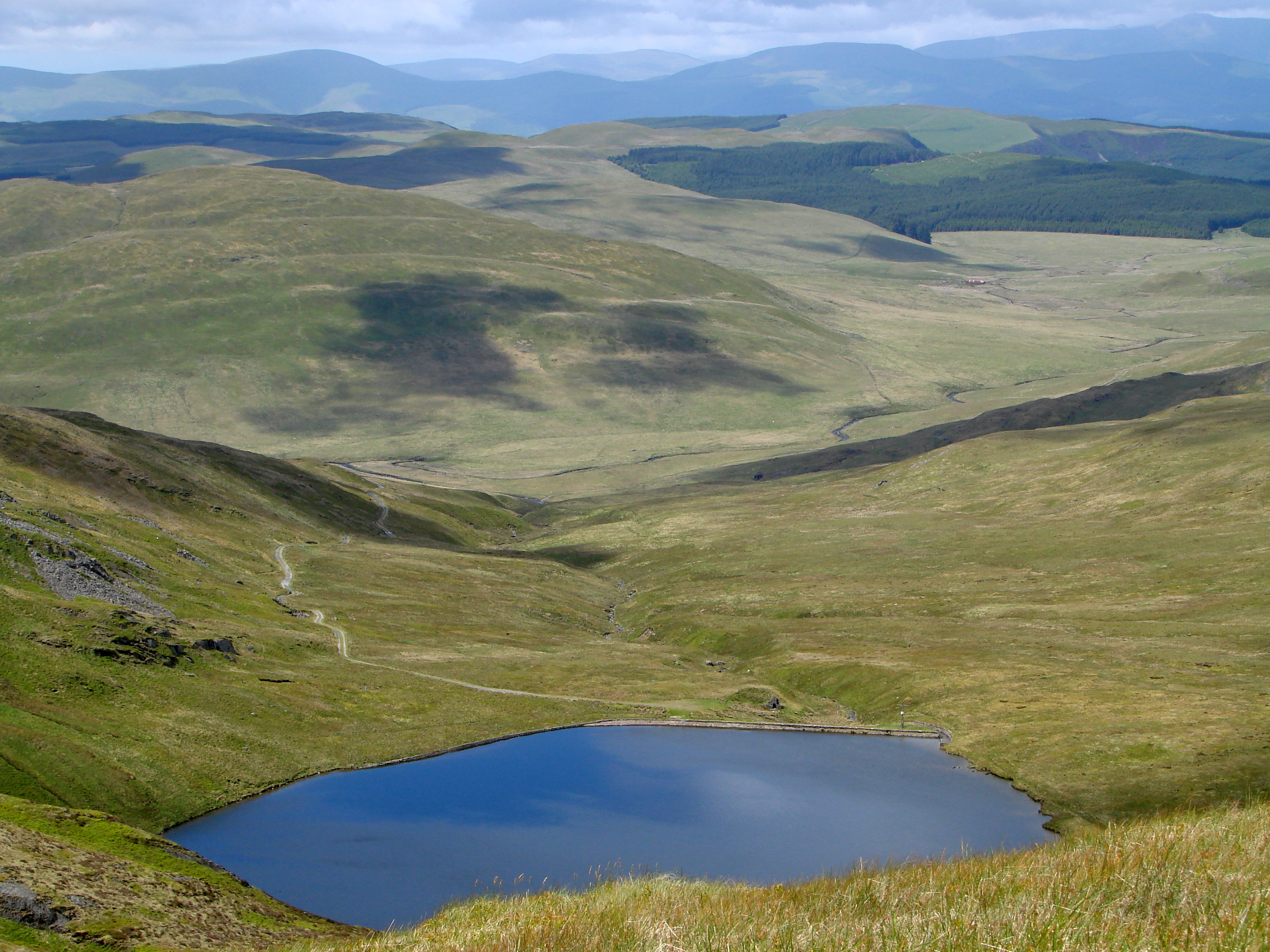
View over Llyn Llygad Rheidol from near the summit of Pumlumon

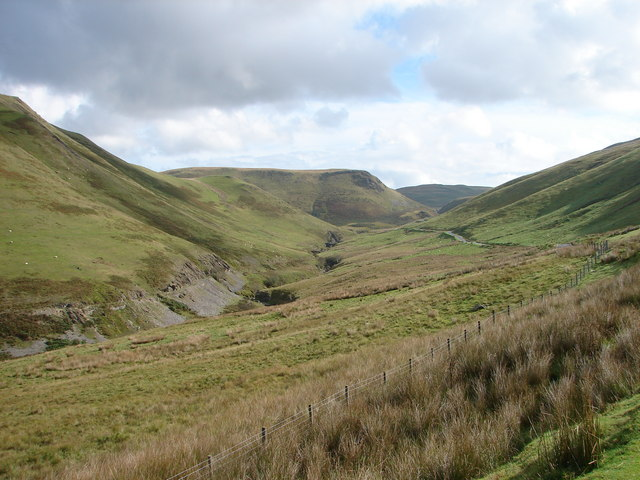
View near Cwmystwyth

The Cambrian Mountains (Welsh: Mynyddoedd Cambria, in a narrower sense: Elenydd) are a series of mountain ranges in Wales. The term Cambrian Mountains used to apply to most of the upland of Wales, and comes from the country's Latin name Cambria. Since the 1950s, its application has become increasingly localised to the geographically homogeneous Mid Wales uplands, known in Welsh as Elenydd, which extend from Plynlimon (Pumlumon) to Radnor Forest in the east and Mynydd Mallaen to the south. This barren and sparsely populated 'wilderness' has been referred to as the Desert of Wales. The area includes the sources of the River Severn and River Wye and was unsuccessfully proposed as a national park in the 1960s and 1970s. The highest point of the range is Plynlimon, at 2,467 feet (752 m).

The wider, more historic, use of the term also includes Snowdonia in North Wales, and the Brecon Beacons and Black Mountains in South Wales. They range in height up to 3,559 feet (1,085 m) in Snowdonia.

== Geology and topography ==
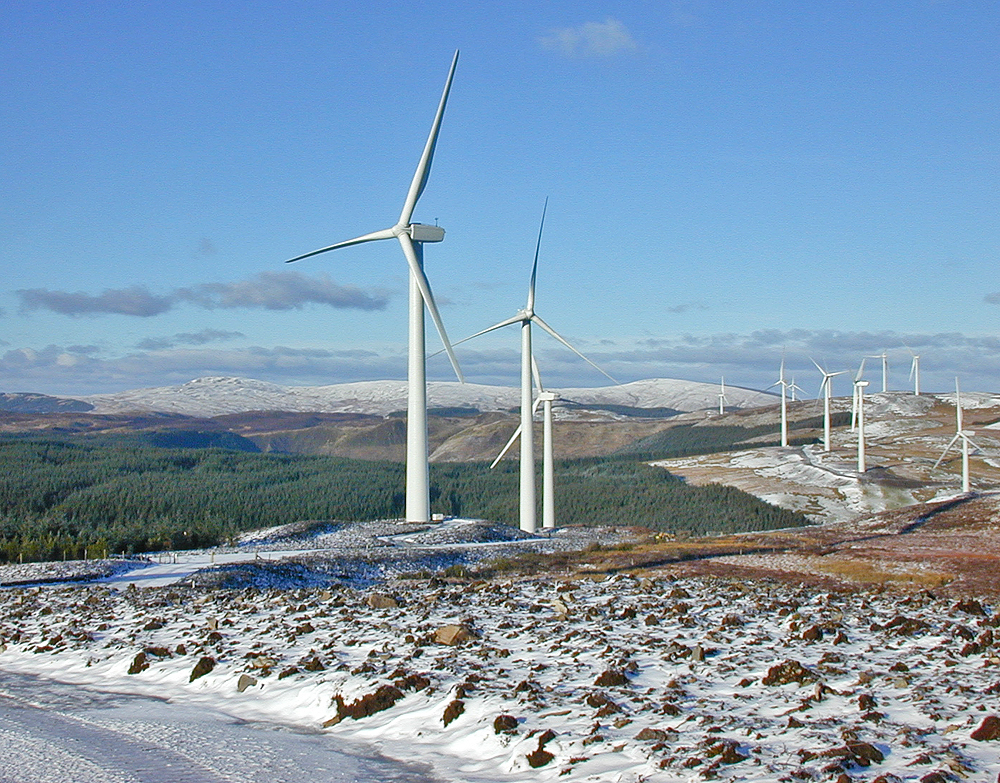
Cefn Croes wind farm

While Snowdonia contains a mix of volcanic rocks and sedimentary rocks of Cambrian and Ordovician age, the mountains of South Wales are mainly Devonian age Old Red Sandstone and Carboniferous Limestone and similarly aged sandstones. The ranges of mid-Wales on the other hand are predominantly formed from Ordovician and Silurian sandstones and mudstones which in many areas outcrop only infrequently so resulting in more rounded grassy hills. The Cambrian Mountains (in the modern sense of the term) are generally less popular with hillwalkers and scramblers than the ranges to their north and south. Since all of Wales' ranges face the predominant westerly air stream coming in from the Atlantic Ocean, they enjoy high levels of rainfall and are the source of numerous rivers, among which the rivers Severn and Wye, which rise on the eastern slopes of Pumlumon, are the largest.

== Dams and wind farms ==
The Cambrian Mountains host the Elan Valley Reservoirs and Llyn Brianne reservoir, which provide water for the English West Midlands and for South Wales respectively. They include the Clywedog Reservoir and Nant y Moch Reservoir. Cefn Croes, the site of a controversial wind farm project, is in the Cambrian Mountains, just south of the A44 road between Aberystwyth and Llangurig.

== National park proposal ==
The area was proposed as a national park in 1965 by the National Parks Commission, a precursor body of the Countryside Commission. However, the proposal was opposed by many farmers and local authorities in the area. Formal consultations on the proposal began in 1970, and in 1971 the Countryside Commission proposed a revised boundary for the designation. The proposed area, of 467 square miles (1,210 km^{2}), covered the area of Pumlumon and Elenydd, within an area bounded by the settlements of Machynlleth, Llangurig, Rhayader, Newbridge-on-Wye, Llanwrtyd Wells, Llandovery, Pumsaint, Tregaron, and Devil's Bridge. Despite continuing local opposition, the Countryside Commission published the order designating the area on 15 August 1972, and submitted it to the Secretary of State for Wales, Peter Thomas, for confirmation.

Objections to the proposed designation were then made by all five county councils, 5 of the 7 district councils, 5 parish councils, the National Farmers Union, the Country Landowners Association, Plaid Cymru, the Campaign for the Protection of Rural Wales and others. Support for the designation was expressed by the Ramblers Association, Youth Hostels Association, and Cyclists' Touring Club. In July 1973, the Secretary of State announced the decision not to proceed with the designation because of "massive evidence of objections", and also rejected a call to hold a public inquiry. This was the first time such a recommendation on national park designation had not been accepted.

== Principal summits ==
This list confines itself to the more geographically restricted area referred to above.

- Pen Pumlumon Fawr [Plynlimon] 2,467 ft (752 m)
- Pen Pumlumon Arwystli 2,431 ft (741 m)
- Pen Pumlumon Llygad-bychan 2,385 ft (727 m)
- Y Garn 2,244 ft (684 m)
- Pumlumon Fach 2,179 ft (664 m)
- Rhos Fawr 2,165 ft (660 m)
- Y Domen Ddu 2,130 ft (650 m)
- Drygarn Fawr 2,116 ft (645 m)
- Gorllwyn 2,011 ft (613 m)
- Bryn Bach 2,000 ft (610 m)
- Pen y Garn 2,004 ft (611 m)
- Y Gamriw 1,982 ft (604 m)
- Llan Ddu Fawr 1,948 ft (594 m)
- Pegwn Mawr 1,923 ft (586 m)
- Clipyn Du 1,909 ft (582 m)
- Y Glog (Draws Drum) 1,883 ft (574 m)
- Cefn Croes 1,879 ft (573 m)

== Gallery ==
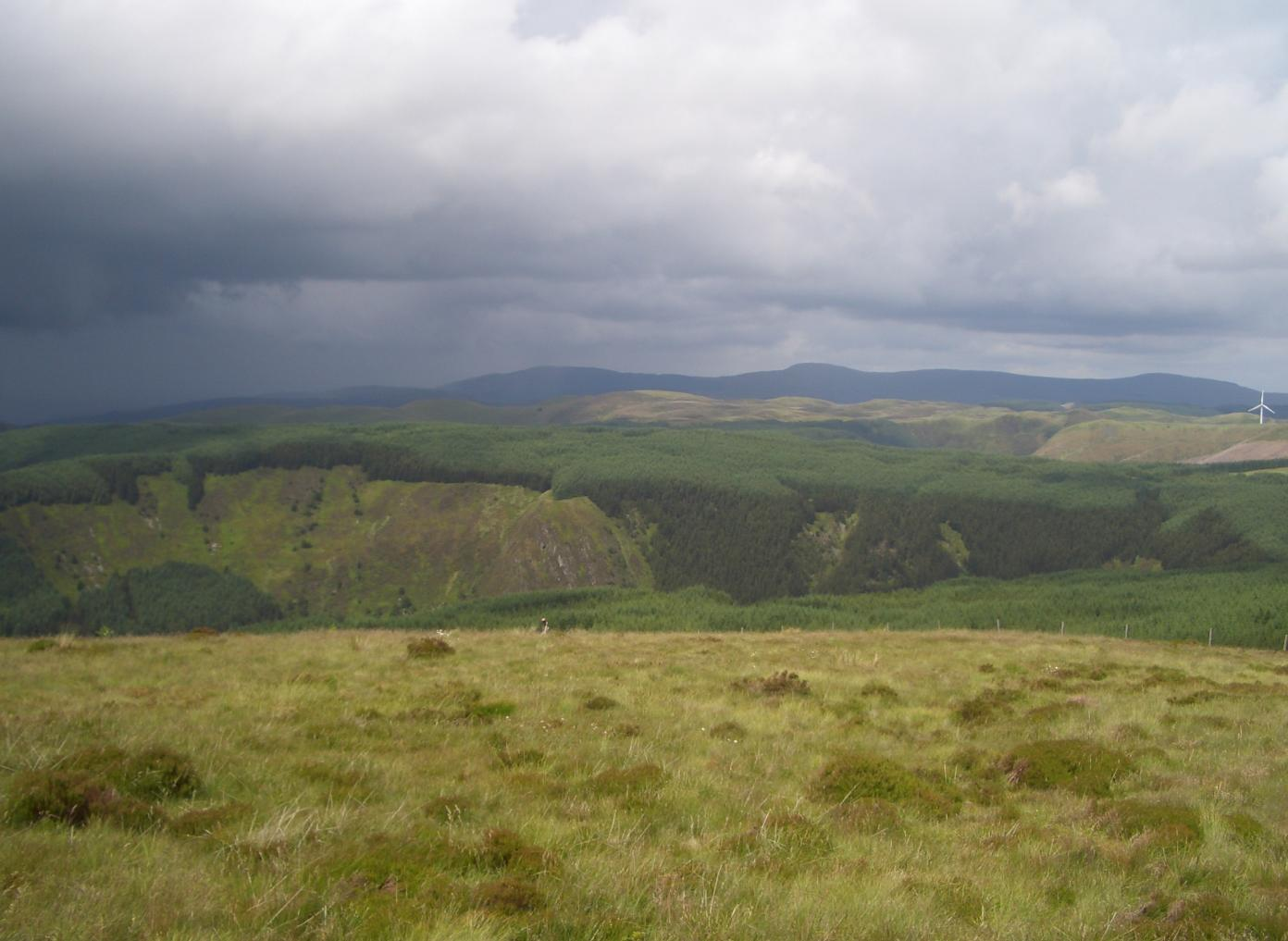
The Nant Rhuddnant gorge looking north to Cefn Coch from the summit of Pen y Garn. In the background are Y Garn(left), Pen Pumlumon Fawr and Pen Pumlumon Arwystli (right)

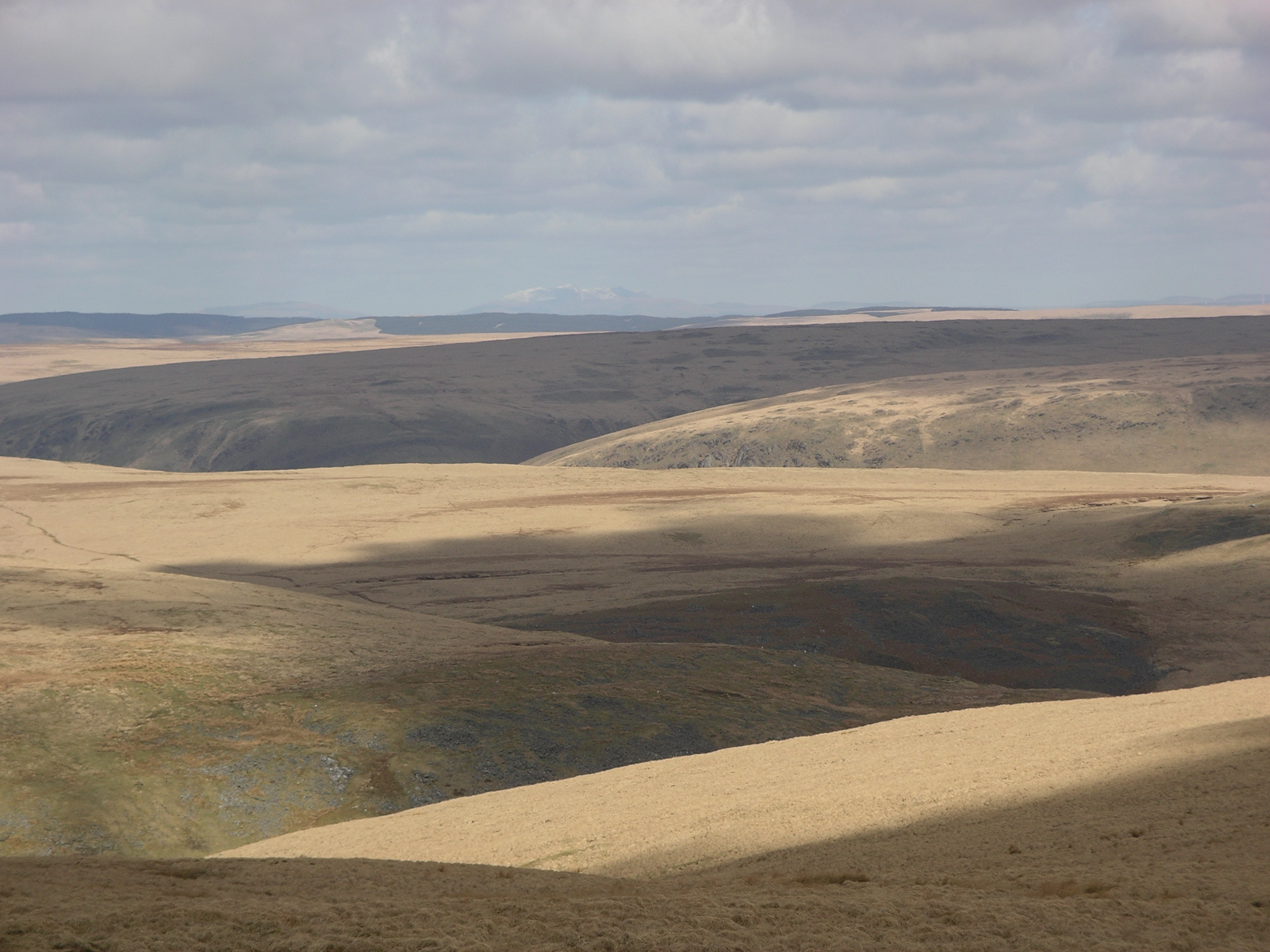
The Desert of Wales seen from Drygarn Fawr

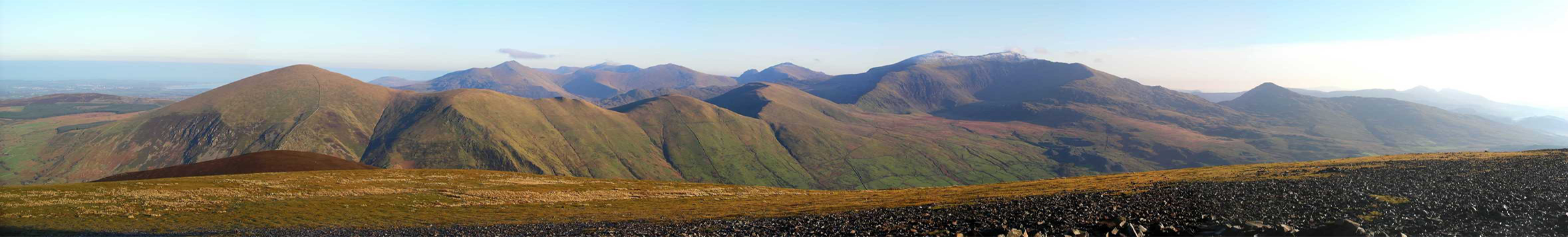
Panorama of some of the Snowdon Massif including Snowdon (centre right) taken from Mynydd Mawr. The Glyderau are visible in the distance

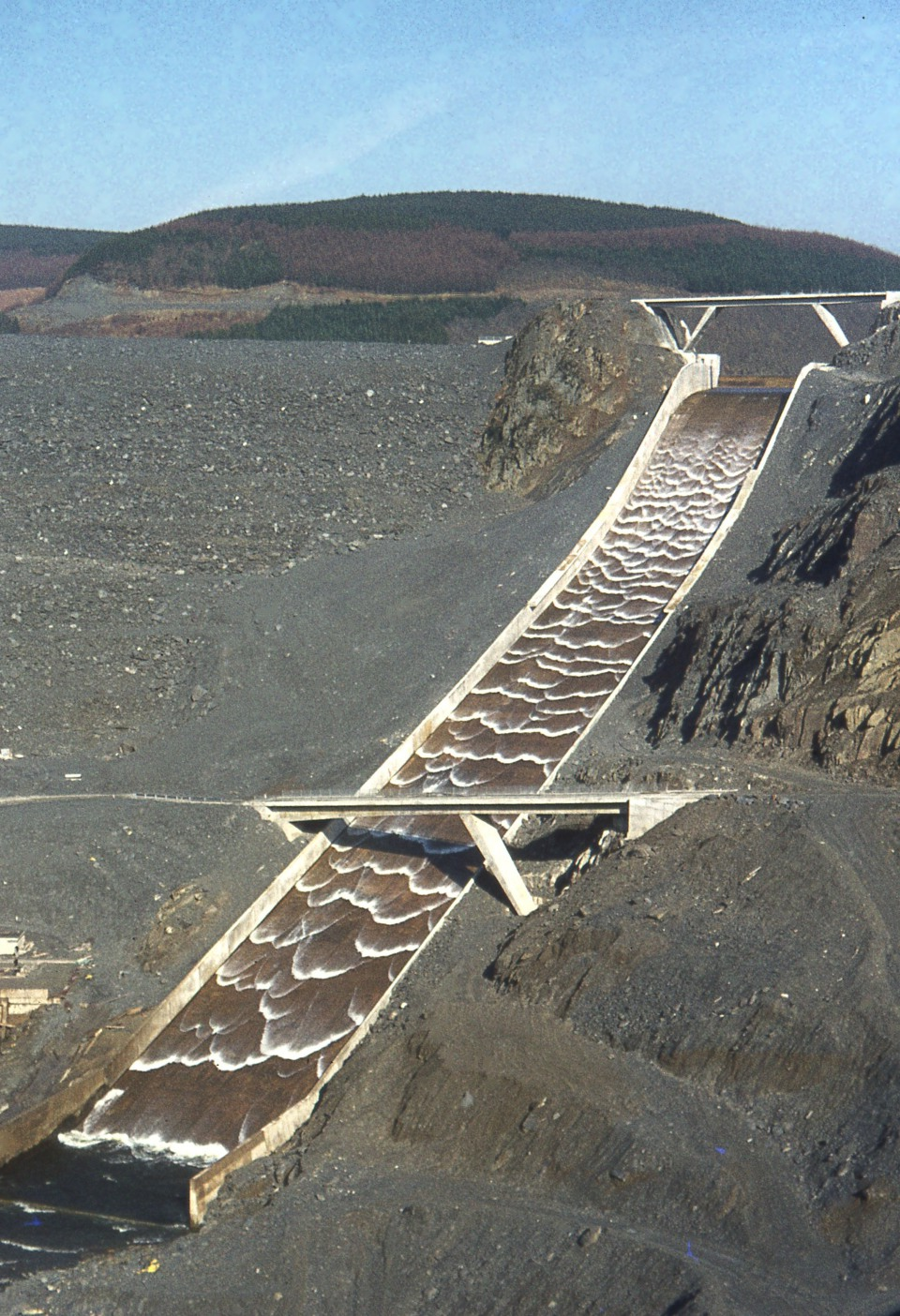
The Llyn Brianne spillway spilling immediately after its first fill at commissioning

== See also ==
- Elenydd
- Desert of Wales
- The Cambrian Way high level long-distance footpath
- Exercise Cambrian Patrol
