= Clipyn Du =

Hill in Powys, Wales

Highest point
- Elevation: 582 m (1,909 ft)
- Prominence: 124 m (407 ft)
- Parent peak: Plynlimon
- Listing: HuMP
- Coordinates: 52°31′22″N 3°46′14″W

Geography
- Country: Wales
- County: Montgomeryshire
- Parent range: Cambrian Mountains

Clipyn Du is a mountain in northern Powys in Wales. It is one of the higher summits of the area and is located a few miles north of Plynlimon (Pumlumon). It has an elevation of 582 m (1,909 ft) and a topographic prominence of 124 m (407 ft), so is classed as a HuMP, having over 100 metres of prominence. Tarren Bwlch-Gwyn is the name of a steep-sided escarpment. Nearby is a lake, Glaslyn.

A natural cleft in the rick here is known as Siambwr Trawsfynydd. Owain Glyndŵr is thought to have camped here in 1401, prior to the Battle of Mynydd Hyddgen.

== Bibliography ==
- Fleming, Ian (2001). Glyndŵr's First Victory: The Battle of Hyddgen 1401. Y Lolfa. ISBN 978-0-86243-590-5.
- Hall, J.J. "Siambr Trawsfynnydd (289772)". Coflein. RCAHMW.
- "Clipyn Du [Tarren Bwlch-gwyn] [Siambr Trawsfynydd]". Hill Bagging. Database of British and Irish Hills.
- Livingston, Michael (2015). France, John; Rogers, Clifford J.; DeVries, Kelly (eds.). Journal of Medieval Military History: Volume XIII (PDF). Boydell & Brewer. pp. 167–178. ISBN 978-1-78327-057-6.
- Tile SN 93 80 (Map) (Explorer ed.). 1:25,000. Ordnance Survey. 2025.
