= Radnor Forest =

Rock dome in Mid Wales

Coordinates: 52.27°N 3.17°W

Radnor Forest (Welsh: Fforest Clud) is a rock dome composed of Silurian shales, mudstones and limestone in the historic county of Radnorshire, Powys, Mid Wales. It is a forest in the medieval sense of the word (an area of land set aside for hunting). It lies within the Welsh Marches region since Offa's Dyke lies nearby to the east.

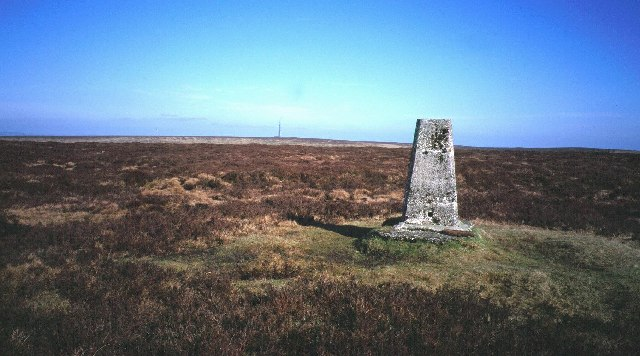
Rhos Fawr summit with trig point in foreground

The area lies to the north of the Black Mountains and to the east of the Cambrian Mountains. Hergest Ridge is immediately to the south-east of the area (just across the English border into Herefordshire), near the small town of Kington. The highest point in the area is Rhos Fawr a broad plateau which reaches 660 metres (2,165 ft), and is equipped with a trig point to mark the summit. A similar plateau adjoining to the east, Black Mixen is the only Nuttall to have a communications mast (a radio transmitter) on its summit.

== Geology ==
The massif is formed from argillaceous rocks of Ludlow age, i.e. late Silurian around 425 million years ago. The strata are exposed around Harley Dingle and Whinyard Rocks. In 2020 the area was in course of being geologically mapped for the publication of the 'Knighton' 1:50,000 scale geological map by the British Geological Survey, no such work having been undertaken in this area since the middle of the nineteenth century.

== Site of Special Scientific interest ==
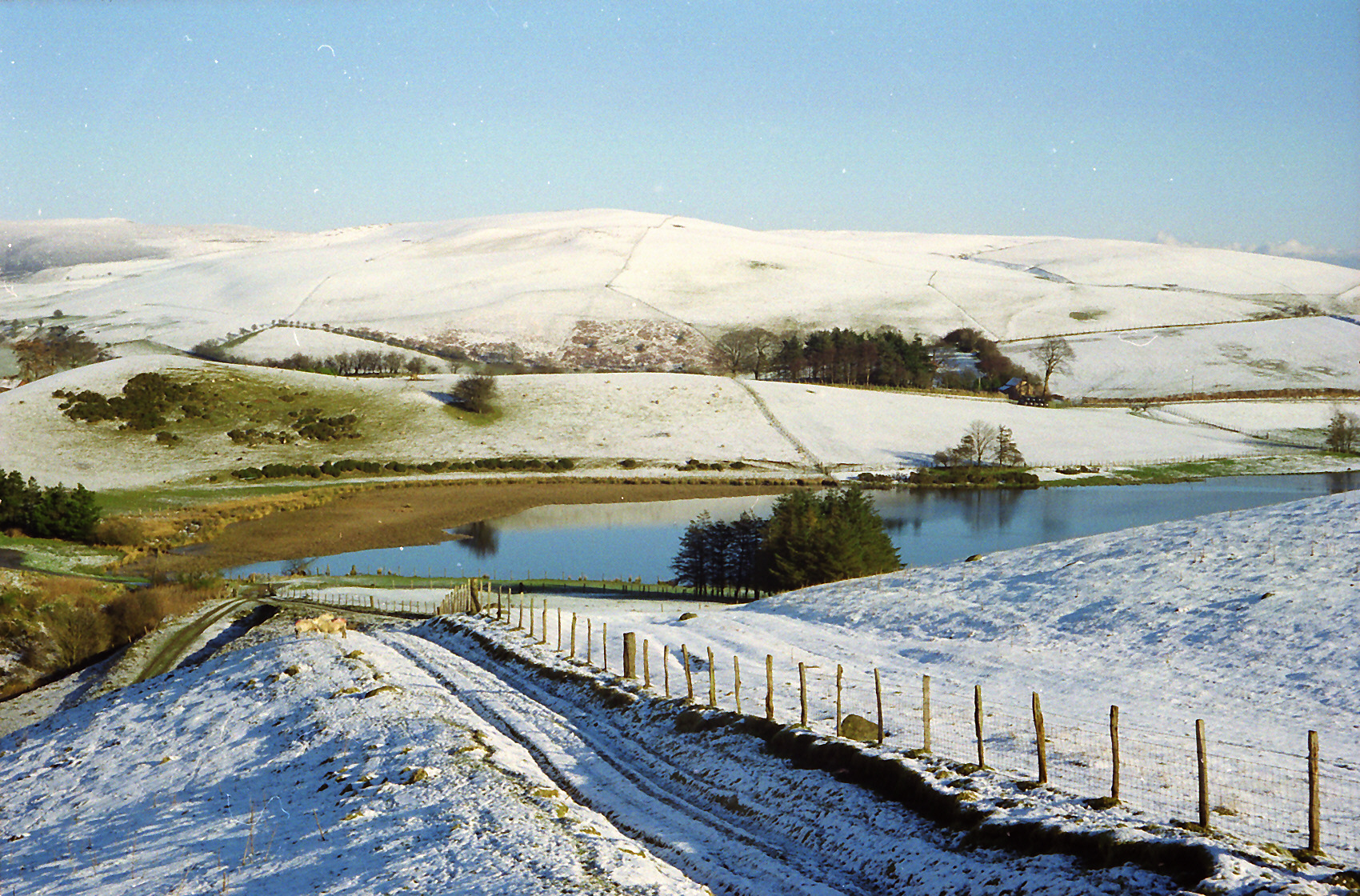
Radnor Forest from the south

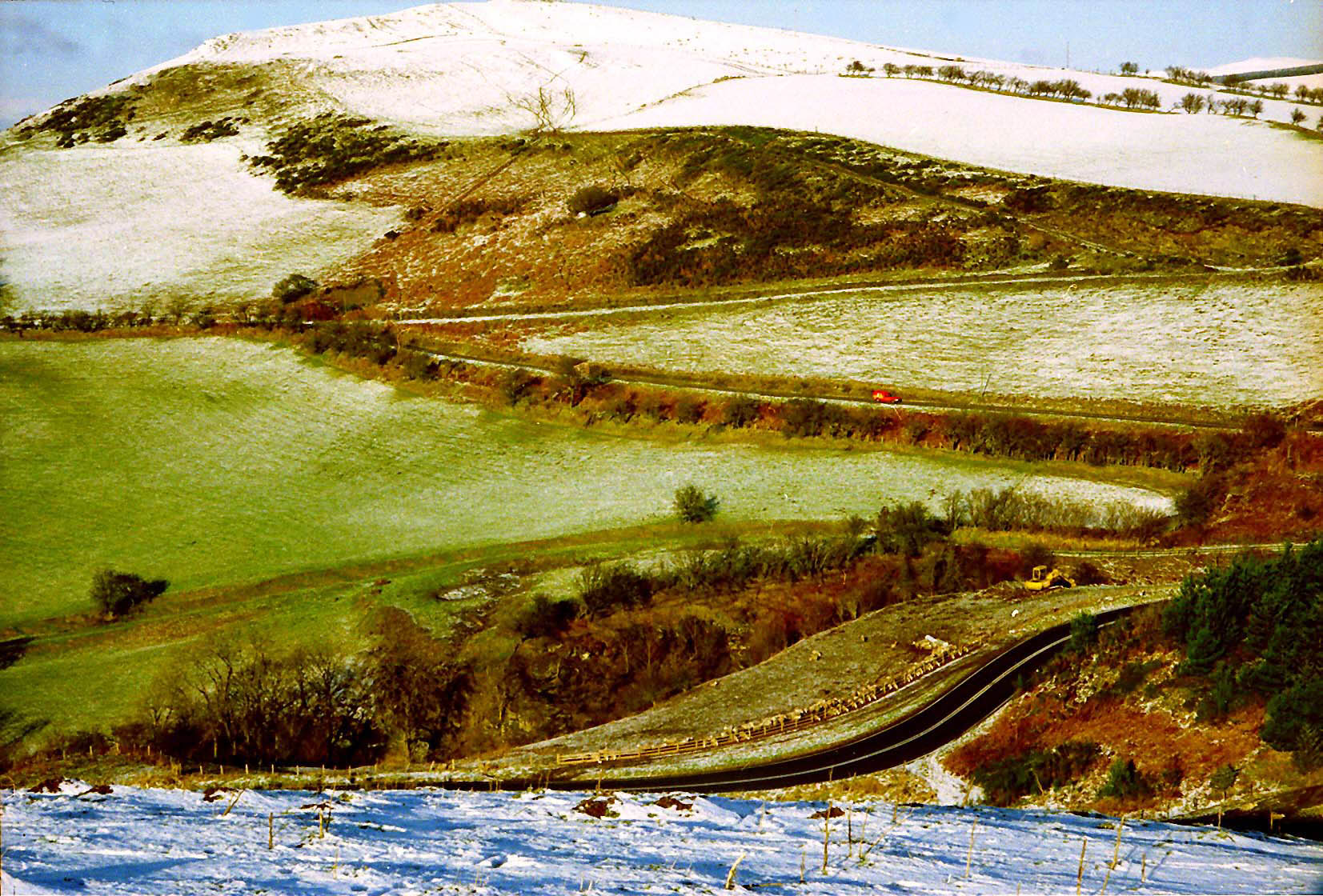
Postal delivery in Radnor Forest

Part of the area is a designated and protected SSSI, with rare saxifrage and other plants. It covers the highest peaks and a rocky gorge near the centre.

The vegetation of the summit ridges is fairly uniform, and is dominated by a mixture of dwarf shrubs, heather, crowberry, and bilberry. Mixed with these dwarf shrubs are hare's-tail cottongrass, purple moor-grass, sedges such as Carex binervis and a number of mosses and lichens. The dwarf shrubs are very well grown and suggest the area has suffered little from fires in the recent past and that grazing pressures are light. Purple moor-grass is but thinly scattered and does not form the extensive stands so familiar only a few miles west. Peat pools support common cottongrass Eriophorum angustifolium.

The steep-sided dingles and rock outcrops of the Forest's edge support rich plant communities, since these eastern Silurian shales are slightly calcareous. Mossy saxifrage and rock stonecrop are common on some cliff faces, with marjoram and a number of interesting mosses and liverworts.

A variety of typical upland breeding birds are present, including raptors such as the red kite and common buzzard, as well as red grouse, whinchat, European stonechat, northern wheatear and the white-throated dipper at or near the many streams in the forest. Radnorshire Wildlife Trust maintain the 82 acre (33 hectare) Mynydd Ffoesidoes Nature Reserve on the summit plateau.

== Archaeology ==
The topmost parts of the forest exhibit several Bronze Age round barrows, and there are also several ring cairns in the area. Most occur on or near the peaks, such as Black Mixen and Bache Hill. Prehistoric settlement is shown by hut circles often present as distinctive platforms. On the west side of Harley Dingle is a distinctive landscape feature known as "The Three Wriggles", a set of three gulleys running down the mountain slope on the western side of the Harley valley. There is also some evidence for mining activity. The town of New Radnor was a planned Norman settlement, and there is a large mound just to the north of the town marking the site of a motte and bailey castle.

== Radnor Range ==
The forest was exploited as a military training area during the Second World War, and has remnants of such activity such as bomb craters and slit trenches. The Harley Dingle site was used by Imperial Chemical Industries' defence arm during the 1920s. It was subsequently used in connection with the development of rocket motors and other weapons systems. Now operated by Radnor Range Ltd, it is still used for testing ammunition and ordnance. A public exclusion zone exists around the facility with multiple warning flags and signs at the boundaries of the range. The zone was extended during 2017. Beyond the exclusion zone, further land to the west of Black Brook is subject to restricted access due to the presence of unexploded ordnance.

== Waterfall ==
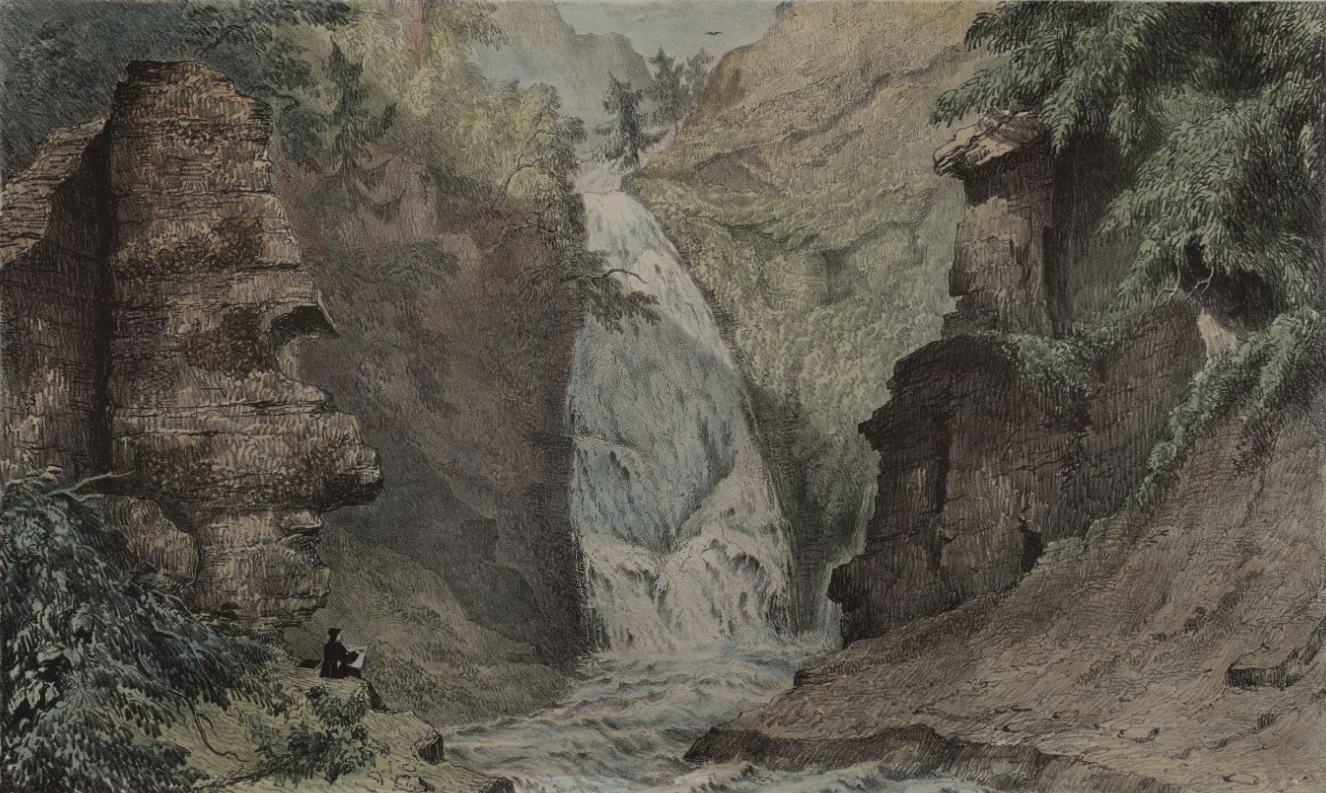
The waterfall known as "Water break-its-neck"

The area is home to a waterfall or cascade which is known as "Water Break-its-neck". The Waterfall has been popular with tourists for over 200 years and was an especially popular destination for Victorian tourists.

It can be reached via a short rough track or forestry road from the A44 main road from Kington to Aberystwyth, shortly after New Radnor, and there is a small car park for visitors to the Warren Wood reserve maintained by Natural Resources Wales. The cascade can be reached via a short walkway beside the river in the hanging valley. There are two other small car parks around the edge of the forest to the north and the east which allow public access to the moorland and woods.

== Legends ==
According to a legend, the local people built four churches in a circle around the Radnor Forest in order to contain the last dragon in Wales, who lay sleeping in the area. The churches, at Llanfihangel Cefnllys, Llanfihangel Rhydithon (Dolau), Llanfihangel Nant Melan and Llanfihangel Cascob, were all dedicated to St Michael (Welsh: Mihangel) victor over the dragon. Some people believed that the dragon would awaken if any of the four churches were destroyed.

== Nearby towns ==
There are several small market towns at the feet of the hills, including Llandrindod Wells, Kington, Knighton, and Presteigne,. The latter town was formerly the county town of Radnorshire. The village of New Radnor sits at the southern base of the hills, and there are several other villages nearby, such as Old Radnor, Gladestry and Cascob.
