= Tarrenhendre =

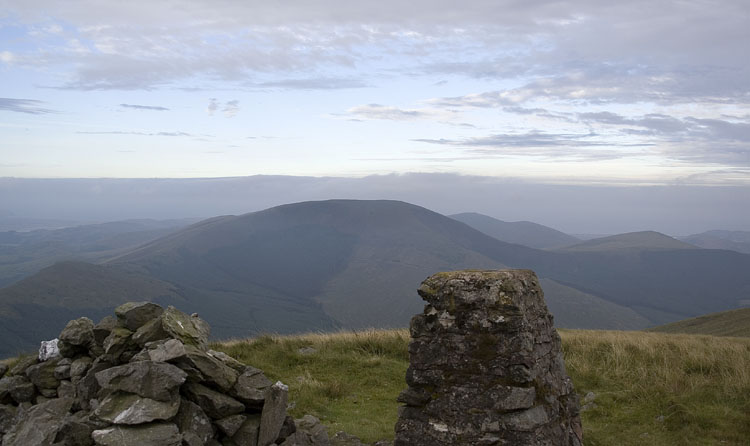
- Tarrenhendre from Tarren y Gesail

Highest point
- Elevation: 634 m (2,080 ft)
- Prominence: 203 m (666 ft)
- Listing: Marilyn, Hewitt, Nuttall
- Coordinates: 52.6182°N 3.9465°W

Naming
- Language of name: Welsh

Geography
- Location: Snowdonia, Wales
- Parent range: Cadair Idris
- Topo map: OS Explorer OL23

Tarrenhendre is a mountain in Snowdonia, North Wales. It is one of the Marilyns in the Cadair Idris group.

== Description ==
Lying to the south of Cadair Idris, it and its neighbour Tarren y Gesail form the bulk of the Tarren subgroup. The Tarrens rise from the south shore of the Tal-y-llyn Lake and end at the Dyfi estuary.

The summit is heathery and boggy, and has a small cairn to mark the highest point. The views are extensive to the south and east, with Plynlimon and Cardigan Bay ahead, while the north views are dominated by Cadair Idris and Maesglase to the west.

Between Tarrenhendre and Tarren y Gesail lies the Bryn Eglwys quarry, and Nant Gwernol railway station on the Talyllyn Railway, in the ravine of the Nant Gwernol stream.

The Tarrens can be thought of as forgotten mountains of Snowdonia, overshadowed by the popularity of Cadair Idris, occupying the sleepy south-western frontier of the Snowdonia national park.
