= Tarren y Gesail =

Mountain in Wales

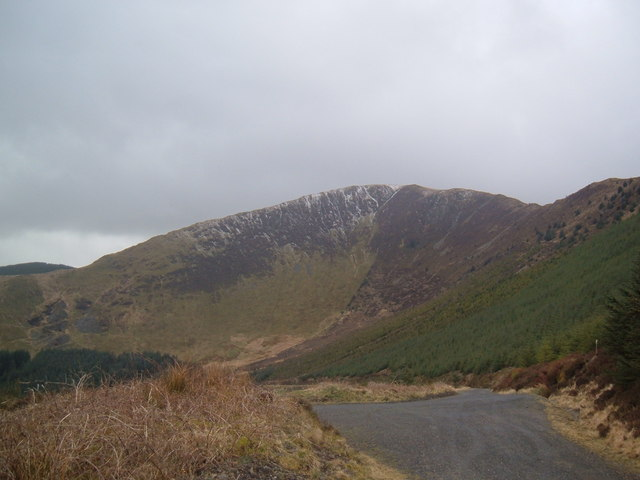
- The south-eastern face of Tarren y Gesail

Highest point
- Elevation: 667 m (2,188 ft)
- Prominence: 465 m (1,526 ft)
- Parent peak: Aran Fawddwy
- Listing: Marilyn, Hewitt, Nuttall
- Coordinates: 52.6354°N 3.9070°W

Naming
- Language of name: Welsh

Geography
- Location: Snowdonia, Wales
- Parent range: Cadair Idris
- Topo map: OS Explorer OL23

Tarren y Gesail is a mountain in Snowdonia, north Wales. It is one of the Marilyns of the Cadair Idris group.

Lying to the south of Cadair Idris, it and its neighbour Tarrenhendre form the bulk of the Tarren subgroup. The Tarrens rise from the south shore of the Llyn Mwyngil (Tal-y-llyn Lake) and end at the Dyfi estuary.

The summit is a grassy ridge, which has a cairn and trig point. The views are extensive to the south and east, with Plynlimon and Cardigan Bay ahead, while the north views are dominated by Cadair Idris and Maesglase to the west.

Between Tarren y Gesail and Tarren Hendre lies the Bryn Eglwys quarry, and Nant Gwernol railway station on the Talyllyn Railway, in the ravine of the Nant Gwernol stream.

The Tarrens can be thought of as forgotten mountains of Snowdonia, overshadowed by the popularity of Cadair Idris, occupying the sleepy south-western frontier of the national park.
