= Ceredigion =

County in Wales

- County
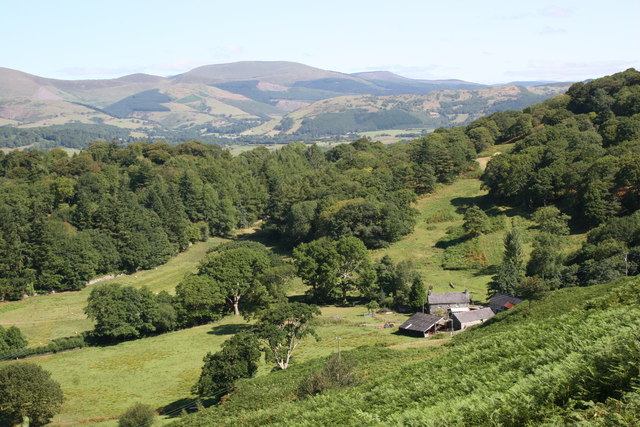

- Flag Coat of arms
- Motto: Welsh: Golud Gwlad Rhyddid, lit. 'the wealth of the land is freedom'
- Ceredigion shown within Wales
- Coordinates: 52°15′10″N 4°00′01″W
- Sovereign state: United Kingdom
- Country: Wales
- Preserved county: Dyfed
- Incorporated: 1 April 1996
- Administrative HQ: Aberaeron and Aberystwyth

Government
  - Type: Principal council
  - Body: Ceredigion County Council
  - Control: Plaid Cymru
  - MPs: Ben Lake (PC)
  - MSs: 6 MSs: 6 in Ceredigion Penfro

Area
  - Total: 689 sq mi (1,785 km^{2})
  - Rank: 4th

Population (2025)
  - Total: 72,696
  - Rank: 19th
  - Density: 110/sq mi (41/km^{2})

Welsh language (2021)
  - Speakers: 45.3%
  - Rank: 3rd
- Time zone: UTC+0 (GMT)
  - Summer (DST): UTC+1 (BST)
- ISO 3166 code: GB-CGN
- GSS code: W06000008
- Website: ceredigion.gov.uk

Ceredigion (Welsh: [kɛrɛˈdɪɡjɔn]), historically Cardiganshire (/ˈkɑːrdɪɡənˌʃɪər, -ʃər/, Welsh: Sir Aberteifi), is a county in the west of Wales. It borders Gwynedd across the Dyfi estuary to the north, Powys to the east, Carmarthenshire and Pembrokeshire to the south, and the Irish Sea to the west. Aberystwyth is the largest settlement and, together with Aberaeron, is an administrative centre of Ceredigion County Council.

The county is the second most sparsely populated in Wales, with an area of 688 square miles (1,780 km^{2}) and a population of 71,500; the latter is a decline of 4,492 since the 2011 census. After Aberystwyth (15,935), the largest towns are Cardigan (4,184) and Lampeter (2,970). Ceredigion is considered a centre of Welsh culture, and as of the 2021 census, 45.3% of the population could speak the Welsh language.

To the west, Ceredigion has 50 miles (80 km) of coastline on Cardigan Bay, which is traversed by the Ceredigion Coast Path. Its hinterland is hilly and rises to the Cambrian Mountains in the east, where the highest point is Plynlimon at 752 metres (2,467 ft). The mountains are the source of the county's main rivers: the Rheidol, Ystwyth, Aeron and Teifi; the last of these is Ceredigion's boundary with Carmarthenshire and Pembrokeshire for most of its length.

Ceredigion is named after a minor kingdom which occupied approximately the area of the county in the fifth century AD. The contemporary county has the same borders as Cardiganshire, which was established in 1282 by the English king Edward I after his conquest of Wales. In the 18th and early 19th centuries, the county was more industrialised than it is today; lead, silver and zinc were mined in the area, and Cardigan was the largest port in South Wales. The economy later became highly dependent on dairy farming, but as farming becomes less profitable, it is diversifying into areas such as tourism. The county is home to the National Library of Wales, Aberystwyth University, and the Lampeter campus of University of Wales Trinity St David.

== History ==
Ceredigion has been inhabited since prehistoric times. A total of 170 hill forts and enclosures have been identified across the county and there are many standing stones dating back to the Bronze Age. Around the time of the Roman invasion of Britain, the area was between the realms of the Demetae and Ordovices. The Sarn Helen road ran through the territory, with forts at Bremia and Loventium protecting gold mines near present-day Llanddewi Brefi. Following the Roman withdrawal, Irish raids and invasions were repulsed, supposedly by the forces under a northerner named Cunedda. The 9th-century History of the Britons attributed to Nennius records that Cunedda's son Ceredig settled the area around the Teifi in the 5th century. The territory supposedly remained a minor kingdom under his dynasty until its extinction upon the drowning of Gwgon ap Meurig c. 871, after which it was administered by Rhodri Mawr of Gwynedd before passing to his son Cadell, whose son Hywel Dda inherited its neighbouring kingdom Dyfed and established the realm of Deheubarth. Records are highly obscure; some historians believe that Hyfaidd ap Bledrig, the Dyfed ruler, may have annexed Ceredigion before his heirs lost it to Hywel through war.

Many pilgrims passed through Cardiganshire on their way to St Davids. Some came by sea and made use of the churches at Mwnt and Penbryn, while others came by land seeking hospitality at such places as Strata Florida Abbey. Both the abbey and Llanbadarn Fawr were important monastic sites of scholarship and education. Place names including ysbyty denote their association with pilgrims.

In 1282, Edward I of England conquered the principality of Wales and divided the area into counties. One of thirteen traditional counties in Wales. Cardiganshire was split into the five hundreds of Genau'r-Glyn, Ilar, Moyddyn, Penarth and Troedyraur.

Much later, Cardiganshire was designated as a vice-county.

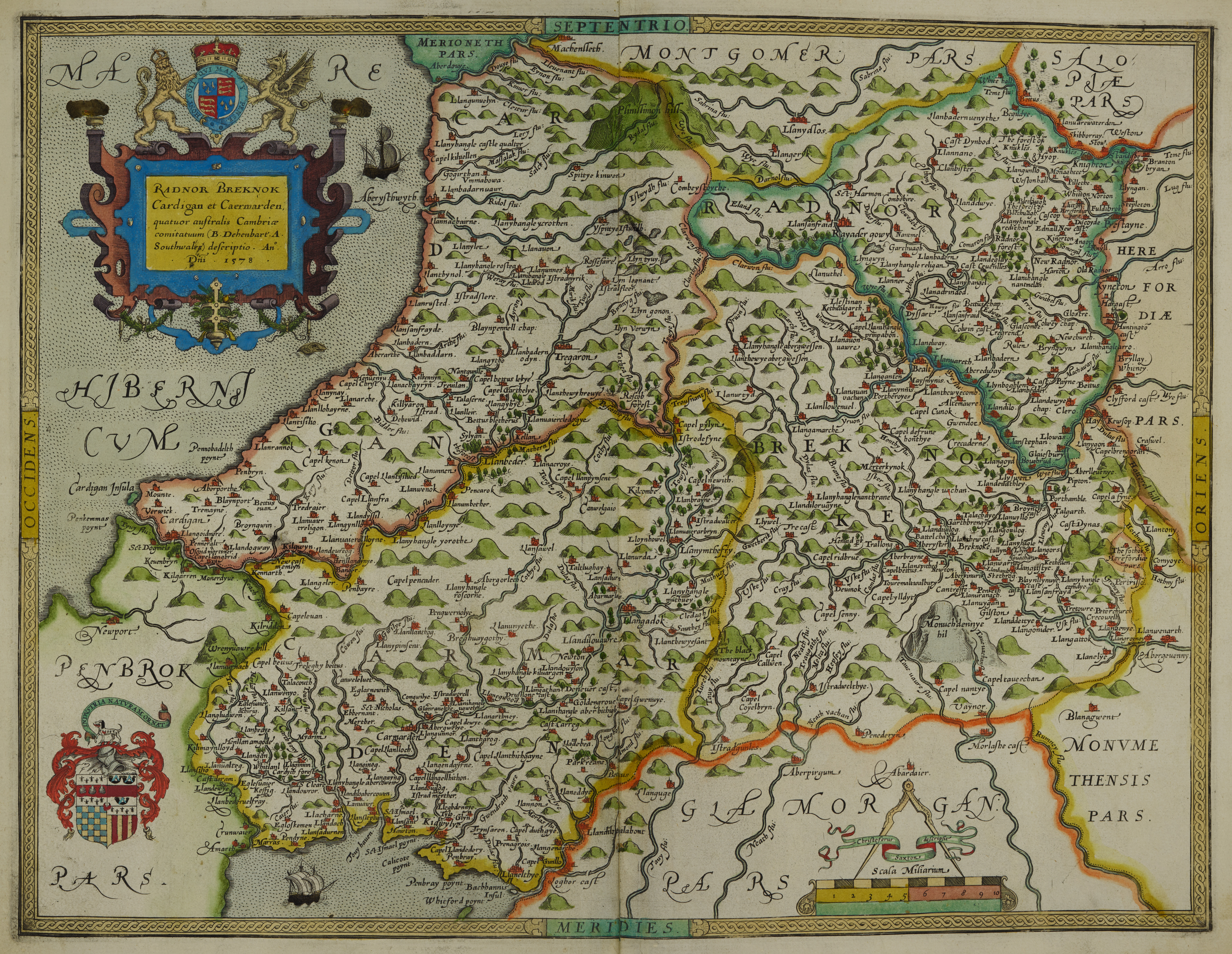
Hand-drawn map of Radnorshire, Brecknockshire, Cardiganshire and Carmarthenshire by Christopher Saxton in 1578

Pen-y-wenallt was home to 17th century theologian and author, Theophilus Evans. In the 18th century there was an evangelical revival of Christianity, and nonconformism became established in the county as charismatic preachers like Daniel Rowland of Llangeitho attracted large congregations. Every community built its own chapel or meeting house, and Cardiganshire became one of the centres of Methodism in Wales; the Aeron Valley was at the centre of the revival.

Cardigan was one of the major ports of southern Wales until its harbour silted in the mid-19th century. The Industrial Revolution passed by, not much affecting the area. In the uplands, wheeled vehicles were rare in the 18th century, and horses and sleds were still being used for transport. On the coast, herrings and corn were traded across the Irish Sea. In the 19th century, many of the rural poor emigrated to the New World from Cardigan, between five and six thousand leaving the town between 1790 and 1860. Aberystwyth became the main centre for the export of lead and Aberaeron and Newquay did brisk coastal trade. The building of the railway from Shrewsbury in the 1860s encouraged visitors, and hotels sprang up in the town to accommodate them.

This area of the county of Dyfed became a district of Wales under the name Ceredigion in 1974 under the Local Government Act 1972, and since 1996, has formed the county of Ceredigion. According to the 2021 census 45.3% of the population can speak Welsh, the third highest proportion after Gwynedd and the Isle of Anglesey. Nevertheless, this was a decline from 47.3% in 2011 and 52% in 2001.

== Geography ==
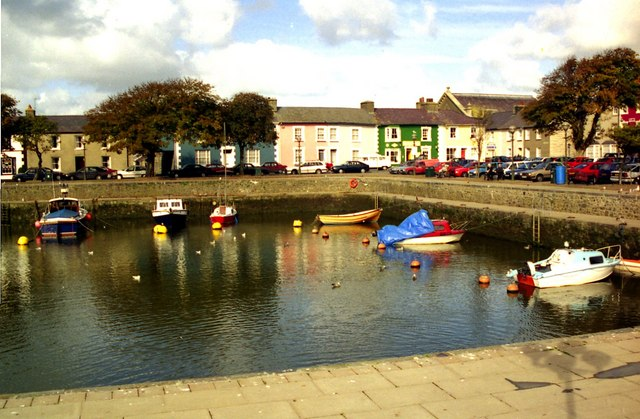
Aberaeron Harbour

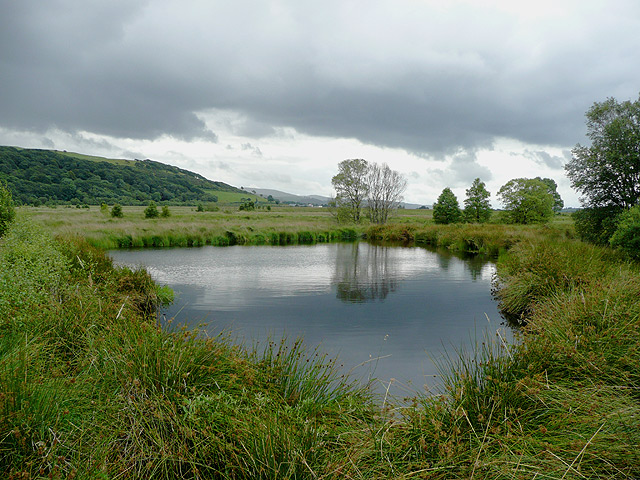
Cors Caron, near Tregaron

Ceredigion is a coastal county, bordered by Cardigan Bay to the west, Gwynedd to the north, Powys to the east, Carmarthenshire to the south and Pembrokeshire to the south-west. Its area is 1,795 square kilometres (693 mi^{2}). In 2010 the population was 76,938, making it the second most sparsely populated county in Wales.

The main settlements are Aberaeron, Aberporth, Aberystwyth, Borth, Cardigan, Lampeter, Llanarth, Llanddewi Brefi, Llandysul, Llanilar, Llanrhystud, Llanon, New Quay, and Tregaron. The largest of these are Aberystwyth and Cardigan.

The Cambrian Mountains cover much of the east of the county; this large area forms part of the desert of Wales. In the south and west, the surface is less elevated. The highest point is Plynlimon (Pumlumon) at 2,467 feet (752 m), other Marilyns include Pen y Garn and Llan Ddu Fawr. On the slopes of Pumlumon five rivers have their sources: the Severn, the Wye, the Dulas, the Llyfnant and the Rheidol, the last of which meets the Afon Mynach in a 300 feet (91 m) plunge at the Devil's Bridge chasm. The largest river is the River Teifi which forms the border with Carmarthenshire and Pembrokeshire for part of its length. The towns of Lampeter, Llandysul, Newcastle Emlyn and Cardigan are all in the Teifi Valley, and each has communities on each side of the river, in different counties. Other significant rivers include the River Aeron which has its estuary at Aberaeron, and the River Ystwyth and the River Rheidol both of which reach the sea in Aberystwyth harbour.

Ceredigion's 50 miles (80 km) of coastline has sandy beaches. In 2011 Ceredigion's beaches were awarded five Blue Flag Awards, four Green Coast Awards, and fourteen Seaside Awards. Ceredigion is one of only two places in the United Kingdom with a permanent presence of bottlenose dolphins. Another member of the fauna is the red kite; these may be seen in various localities in the county, but at the Red Kite Feeding Centre near Tregaron, they are fed each day, and large numbers congregate along with hungry crows and other birds.

Between 1991 and 2003 Ceredigion had the largest population growth of any county in Wales, with a 19.5% increase. Tourism and agriculture, chiefly hill farming, are the most important industries. In addition, two universities are within the county boundaries: Aberystwyth University and the Lampeter campus of the University of Wales, Trinity Saint David. The Welsh Plant Breeding Station is near Aberystwyth and linked to the University. The National Library of Wales, founded in 1907, is also in Aberystwyth. Ceredigion is an extremely rural county; the largest town, Aberystwyth, has fewer than 15,000 permanent residents and the remainder of the population of the county is scattered over 150 small towns, villages and hamlets. According to the 2011 UK census the population of Ceredigion was around 75,900. By the time the 2021 UK census was taken this had fallen by 5.8% to 71,500.

The county has no large commercial areas. The nearest substantial settlements are located at least 1 hour 45 minutes drive away. Approximate road distances from Ceredigion's largest town, Aberystwyth, are: Swansea, 75 miles (121 km) to the south; Shrewsbury, 76 miles (122 km) to the east, in the English county of Shropshire; and Wrexham, 82 miles (132 km) to the northeast. The capital, Cardiff, is over 100 miles (160 km) from most parts of the county. Although Ceredigion and Gwynedd share a boundary, it is not possible to travel directly between the two by land as all road and rail links avoid the Dyfi estuary and pass through Dyfi Junction or Machynlleth in Powys.

== Government ==
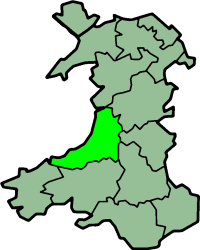
Ceredigion, as shown with traditional boundaries

Between 1889 and 1974, the county was governed by Cardiganshire County Council, which took over the local government functions of the quarter sessions. The county council was abolished in 1974 by the Local Government Act 1972, with the area becoming the lower-tier district of Ceredigion within the larger county of Dyfed. Until 1974, Cardiganshire had been governed locally by civil parishes; these in large part equated to ecclesiastical parishes, most of which still exist as part of the Church in Wales. Further local government reform under the Local Government (Wales) Act 1994 saw the area become a unitary authority on 1 April 1996. The 1994 act specified that the reformed council was to have both a Welsh and an English name: Sir Aberteifi / Cardiganshire. Before the new arrangements came into force the incoming council resolved to change the name to Ceredigion in both languages. The government agreed the change of name, which took effect on 2 April 1996, one day after the new authority formally came into being.

A referendum was held on 20 May 2004 on whether to have a directly elected mayor for the county, which would have been the first in Wales. The Llais Ceredigion political initiative had been formed with this aim, but the proposal was rejected.

As of 2024, the council leader is Bryan Davies of Plaid Cymru.

The entire county comprises the Senedd constituency of Ceredigion Penfro, with its six Members of the Senedd since 2026 being:

- Elin Jones (Plaid Cymru)
- Susan Claire Archibald (Reform UK)
- Kerry Ferguson (Plaid Cymru)
- Paul Windsor Davies (Welsh Conservatives)
- Paul Marr (Reform UK)
- Anna Nicholl (Plaid Cymru)

At Westminster, all of Ceredigion is in the Ceredigion Preseli constituency since 2024, replacing Ceredigion. With Ben Lake (Plaid Cymru) being re-elected as the Member of Parliament in the 2024 election.

== Economy ==
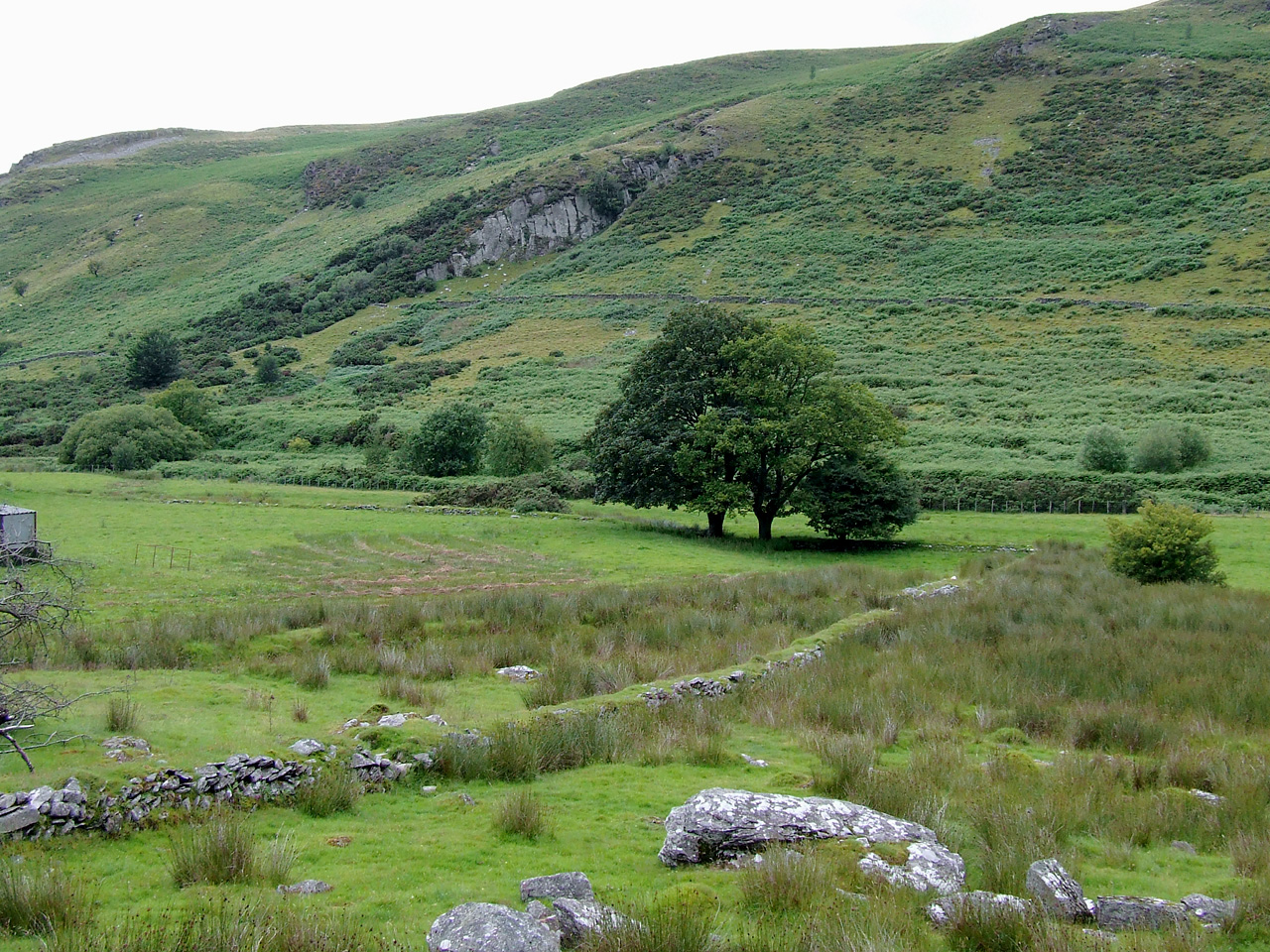
Hill farm at Cwm Brefi

Farming has traditionally been the basis of Cardiganshire's economy, with dairying and stock-rearing being the main occupations. Before the first railway was built in 1866, the stock used to be herded over the mountains to England, where Rugby, Northampton and London were important destinations. At one time there was a sizeable mining industry in Cardiganshire, but the reserves of lead, silver and zinc became unprofitable to mine by the early 20th century. Shipping was also important in the county, with coal and lime being imported in coastal vessels, and mineral ores and oak bark for tanning being exported. Shipbuilding was an important industry: most of Wales' sailing vessels were built in Cardiganshire.

Cardiganshire had a substantial population in the early modern period, but this declined during the 19th century as wider social and economic developments affected all aspects of Cardiganshire life. Traditional industries were in decline, agriculture was in decline and it was becoming increasingly difficult for a still-rising population to earn a living within their native parishes and communities. By the first half of the 20th century, falling livestock prices and greater international competition made farming unprofitable. Many residents of Cardiganshire moved to other parts of South Wales, where there were better employment opportunities, and many more emigrated to the United States, Canada, Patagonia and Australia. Furthermore, the owners of the great landed estates, who had for so long dominated the politics of the county, were in many cases heavily in debt. This led to the loss of landowner influence in the running of the county; this became very apparent at the first elections to the Cardiganshire County Council in 1889.

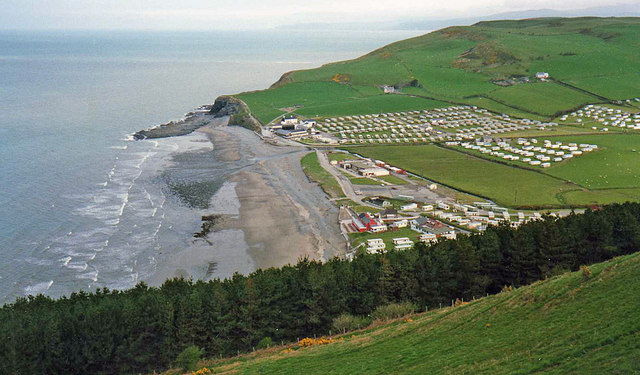
Caravan park at Clarach Bay

By the second half of the 20th century, the population was increasing again. More retired people were arriving to make their home in the tranquil surroundings, and after the Beacham Commission in the 1960s, the British government realised that the rural way of life in parts of Wales was in crisis, and started to react. Through government initiatives and local actions, opportunities in tourism, rural crafts, specialist food shops, farmers' markets and added-value food products began to emerge. However, in 2011, at 3.1%, Ceredigion still had one of the highest proportions of its population working in agriculture, forestry and fishing, close behind such other places as Orkney and Shetland. Exposed, marginal land is also used for wind farms: Cefn Croes Wind Farm near Devil's Bridge has 39 turbines and a nominal capacity of 58.5 MW.

Farm incomes have been in decline over the years; and, as well as being a European Objective I area, in 2001 Ceredigion was designated a regional "Tourist growth area" by the Wales Tourist Board. There is little industry other than farming, so tourism plays an important part in the county's economy. Visitors stay in hotels, guest houses and homes offering bed-and-breakfast, self-catering cottages, caravans and camp sites; they spend money in local shops, dine in local establishments and visit the county's many attractions. Ceredigion prides itself on offering an unspoilt natural landscape, and Aberystwyth claims to be the capital of Welsh culture.

== Leisure ==
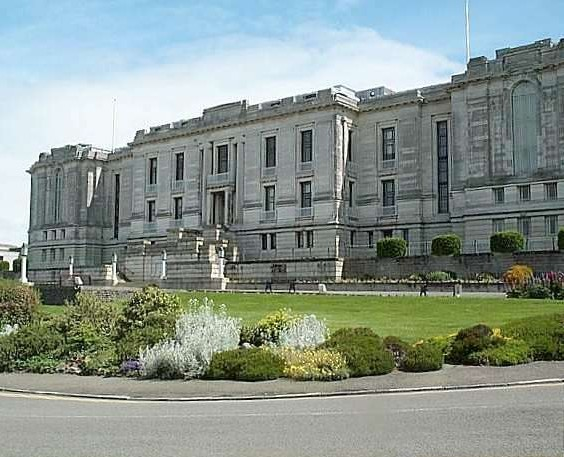
National Library of Wales

The National Library of Wales is at Aberystwyth and there is information on local history at the Ceredigion Museum. There is a technical museum Internal Fire – Museum of Power, which is at Tan-y-groes near the coast road. Stately homes in the county open to the public include the Hafod Estate and Llanerchaeron. It is home to the Aberystwyth Arts Centre.

The county is rich in archaeological remains such as forts, earthworks and standing stones. Historic sites that can be accessed include Aberystwyth Castle and Cardigan Castle, as well as Strata Florida Abbey. Other visitor attractions include the Cwmystwyth Mines, Llywernog Mine, Devil's Bridge, the Bwlch Nant yr Arian Forest Visitor Centre, Elvis Rock, Cors Caron (Tregaron bog), the Vale of Rheidol Railway, and the Aberystwyth Cliff Railway.

Leisure activities available in the county include beach activities, rambling, cycling, sea fishing, canoeing, sailing and horse riding. Many of the towns and villages along the coast have small harbours and facilities for sailing, dolphin watching and other maritime activities. The Ceredigion Coast Path from Cardigan to Ynyslas runs about 60 miles (97 km) along the coast with spectacular scenery. It can conveniently be divided into seven sections. When Dylan Thomas lived in New Quay and Talsarn, he frequented Aberaeron and Lampeter. The Dylan Thomas Trail links places associated with him. Peaceful Places is a heritage tourism trail connecting churches and chapels in North Ceredigion.

The Welsh Government's Visit Wales website describes the River Teifi as "one of the major game rivers of Wales," although there has been concern that salmon stocks are in decline. There are a series of rapids near Llandysul where canoeing, kayaking and white water rafting take place.

The county's main football team, Aberystwyth Town in the Cymru Premier, play their home matches at Park Avenue Stadium. Cardigan Town Football Club, also known as the "Magpies", play in Division 1 of the Ceredigion League.

== Transport ==
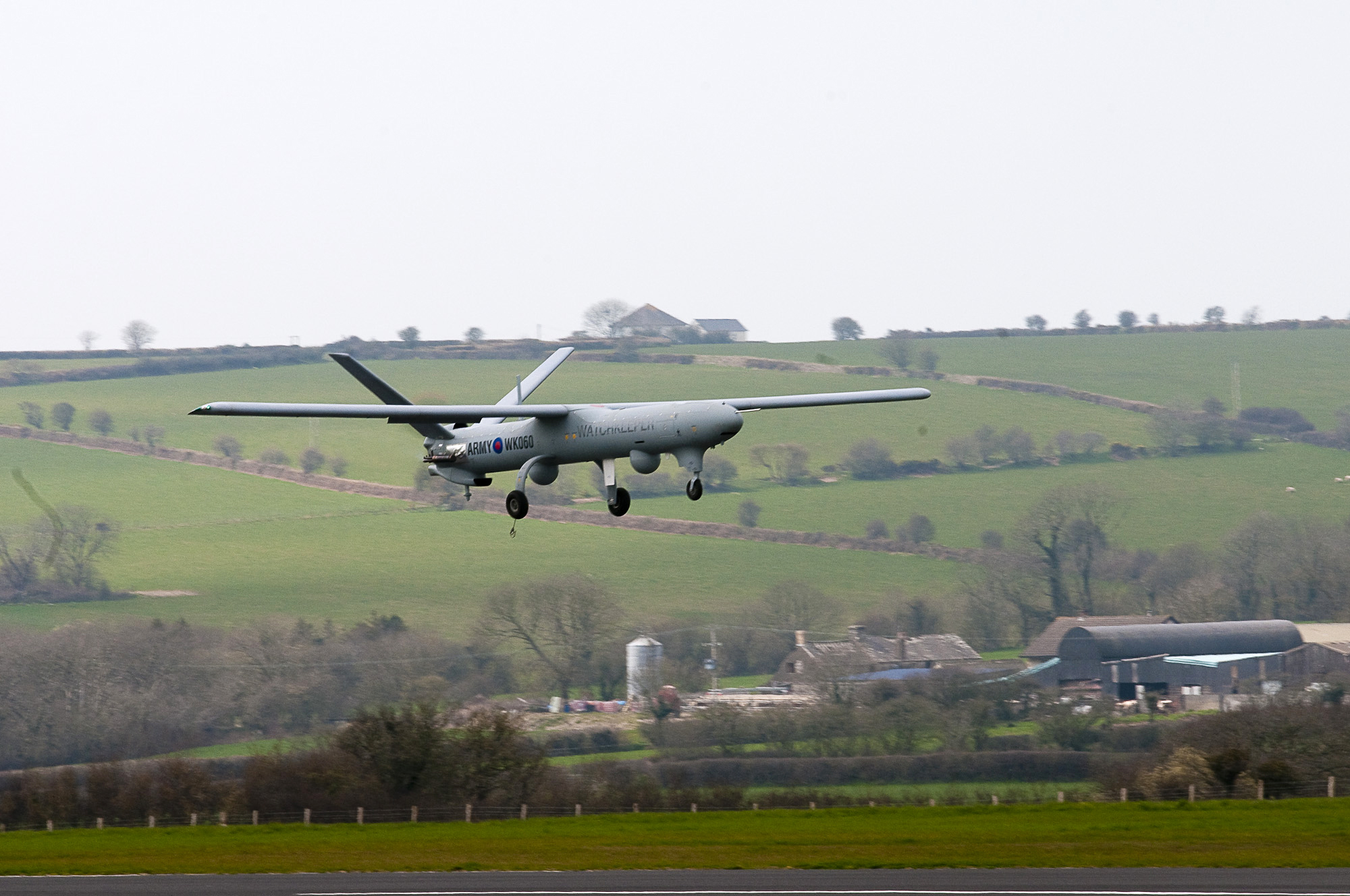
UAV at West Wales airport

The Cambrian Line provides main line railway services between Aberystwyth, Shrewsbury and Birmingham, where passengers can join services for London and elsewhere. Passengers can change at Dovey Junction for trains along the Cambrian Coast Line to Pwllheli.

There are no motorways in Ceredigion; the nearest is the western end of the M4 motorway at Pont Abraham, near Pontarddulais in Carmarthenshire. The Fishguard to Bangor trunk road, the A487, travels in a north-east direction following the coast from Cardigan to New Quay, through Aberaeron and Aberystwyth. The A44 travels eastwards from Aberystwyth to Llangurig, before turning south then east through Rhayader, Leominster and Worcester.

There are local bus services between the main centres of population, with long distance services between Aberystwyth and Cardiff, via Aberaeron and Lampeter. A bus service known as Bwcabus operates in the south of the county, offering customised transport for rural dwellers. TrawsCymru T1 service runs between Aberystwyth and Carmarthen, with some journeys through Aberaeron and Lampeter.

Aberporth Airport, located south-east of Aberporth, is being developed as West Wales Airport for domestic flights within Wales and the rest of the United Kingdom. The airport is also developing as a centre for the deployment of civil and military unmanned aerial vehicles (UAVs), also known as 'drones'. The airport underwent major improvements in 2008, which extended the length of the runway from 945 to 1,257 m (3,100 to 4,124 ft).

== Library ==
Ceredigion Library has a collection of oral history interviews with people from Ceredigion during the 1960s and 1970s. The recordings were archived, digitised, catalogued and made available during the Unlocking Our Sound Heritage project at the National Library of Wales.

== Notable residents ==
- Theophilus Evans (1693–1767), theologian and writer
- Daniel Rowland (1713–1790), preacher
- Thomas Johnes (1748–1816), politician, writer, landscape architect, owner of the Hafod estate
- Caradoc Evans (1878–1945), writer
- Dylan Thomas (1914–1953), poet and writer
- Finlay Tarling (born 2006), cyclist for Israel Premier Tech Academy
- Josh Tarling (born 2004), cyclist for Ineos Grenadiers

== See also ==
- Seisyllwg
- List of Lord Lieutenants of Cardiganshire
- List of Custodes Rotulorum of Cardiganshire
- List of High Sheriffs of Cardiganshire
- List of Sites of Special Scientific Interest in Ceredigion
- List of schools in Ceredigion
- List of MPs for the Ceredigion (formerly Cardiganshire) constituency
- Centre points of the United Kingdom
- Cuisine of Ceredigion
- Cardigan Welsh Corgi
