= Drygarn Fawr =

Mountain (645m) in Powys, Wales

Coordinates: 52.21203°N 3.66698°W

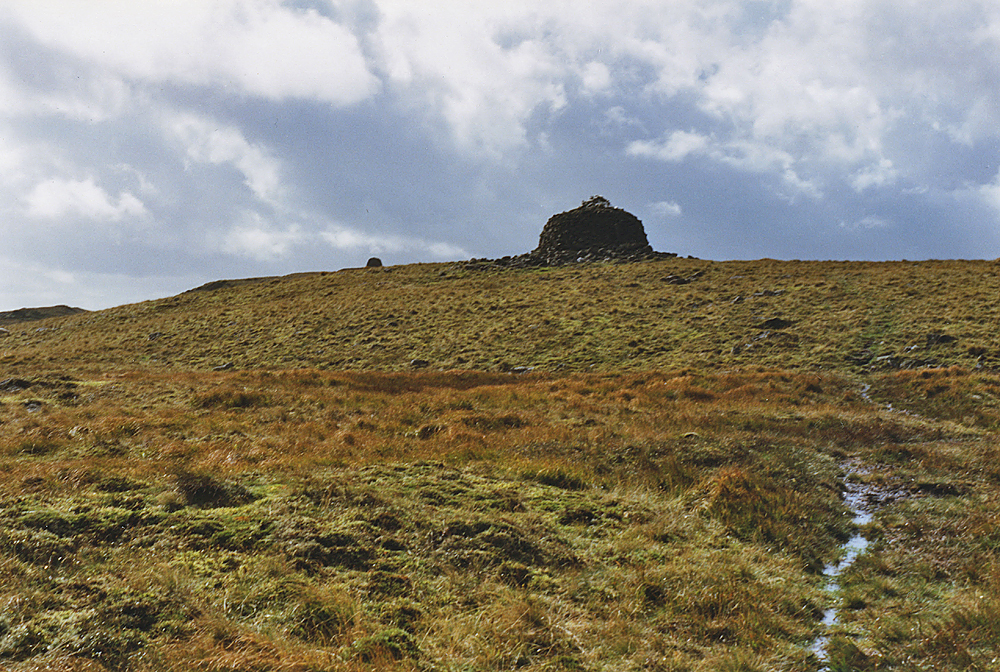
- Eastern approach to Drygarn Fawr

Highest point
- Elevation: 645 m (2,116 ft)
- Prominence: 257 m (843 ft)
- Parent peak: Plynlimon
- Listing: Marilyn, Hewitt, Nuttall

Naming
- English translation: Three large cairns
- Language of name: Welsh

Geography
- Location: Powys, Wales
- Parent range: Cambrian Mountains
- OS grid: SN862584
- Topo map: OS Landranger 147

Listed summits of Drygarn Fawr
Name	Grid ref	Height	Status
Gorllwyn	SO196643	613 metres (2,011 ft)	Hewitt, Nuttall
Y Gamriw	SO213636	604 metres (1,982 ft)	sub Hewitt
Darren	SN908568	524 metres (1,719 ft)	subdodd
Bryn Du	SN839569	555 metres (1,821 ft)	subdodd

Drygarn Fawr is a mountain in the county of Powys, Wales. It is one of the highest summits in Mid Wales at 645 metres (2,116 ft) above sea level. It lies to the south of the Elan Valley Reservoirs. Rising above the remote moorland plateau of the Cambrian Mountains, and to the west of the peaks of Radnor Forest, the summit is topped by two distinctive, large cairns. The mountain has a gentle, grassy, conical shape with a few rocks near the summit. Nearby are the summits of Gorllwyn, Y Gamriw, and Drum yr Eira all over 600m.

== Access ==
There are two paths to the summit. From Llannerch Yrfa, a bridleway winds up through forests in the Nant y Fedw valley before skirting the southern edge of the mountain.

An alternative route may be taken starting from Rhiwnant on the edge of the Caban Coch reservoir, one of the Elan Valley Reservoirs, and following the Nant Paradwys before turning off west towards the summit cairn. Both routes pass across wild moorland and peat bogs and the path may become difficult to follow and impassable, particularly after heavy rain.
