= Ystrad Aeron =

Village in Ceredigion, Wales

Coordinates: 52.18696°N 4.15904°W

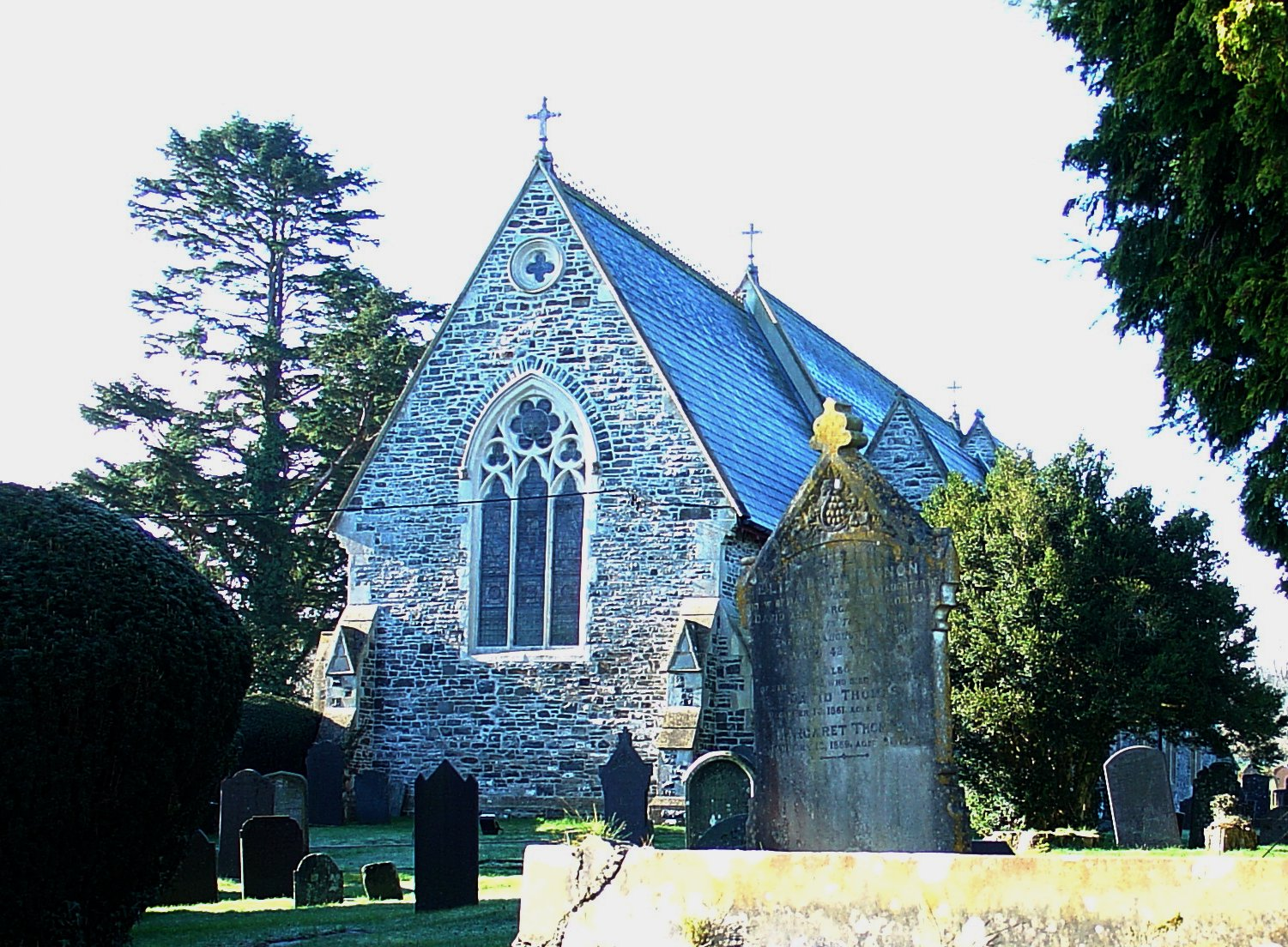
- St Michael's Church, Ystrad Aeron

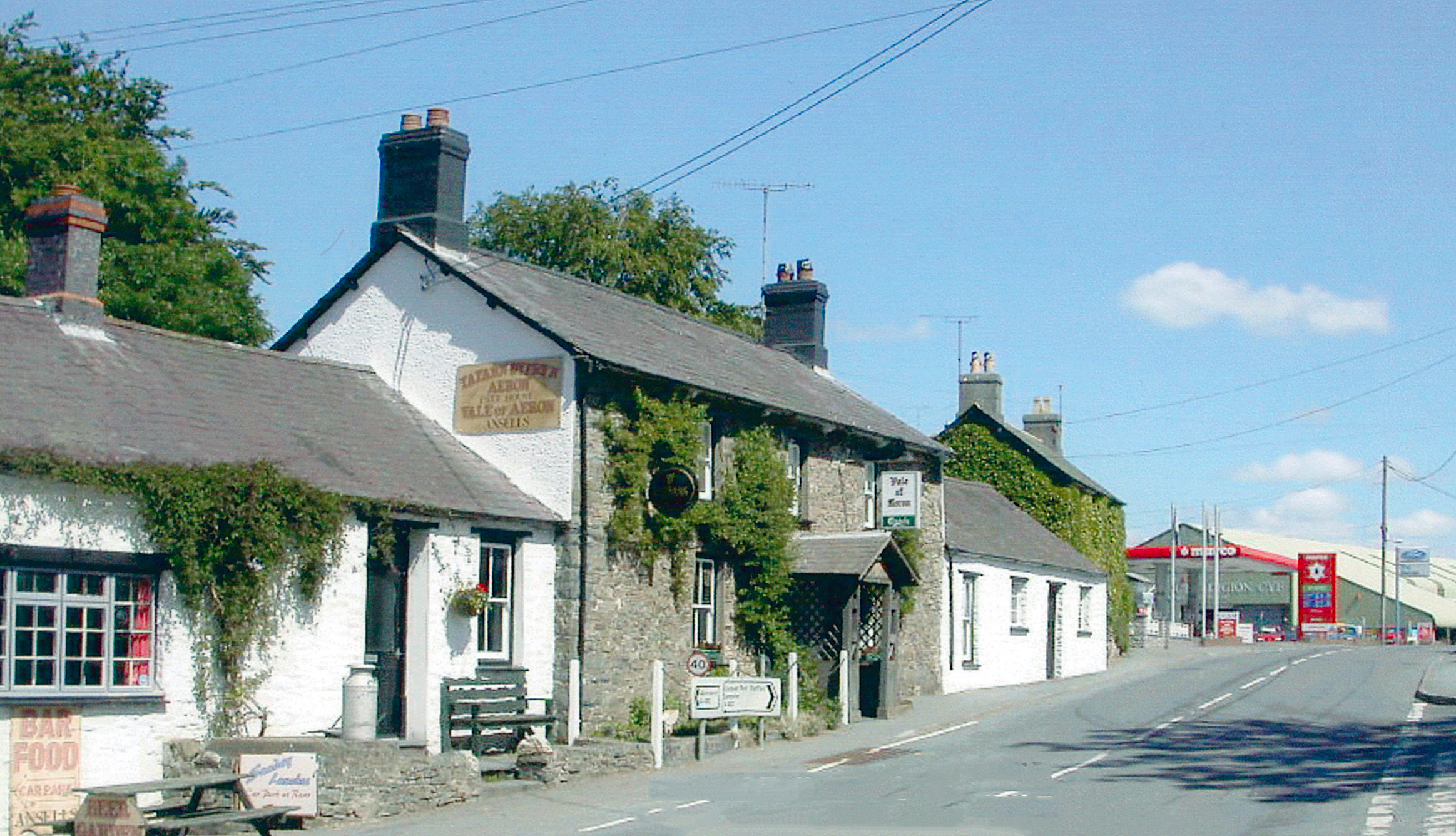
- View of the village showing the Vale of Aeron Inn
- OS grid reference: SN525565
- Principal area: Ceredigion
- Preserved county: Dyfed
- Country: Wales
- Sovereign state: United Kingdom
- Post town: LAMPETER
- Postcode district: SA48
- Dialling code: 01570
- Police: Dyfed-Powys
- Fire: Mid and West Wales
- Ambulance: Welsh
- UK Parliament: Ceredigion Preseli
- Senedd Cymru – Welsh Parliament: Ceredigion Penfro

Ystrad Aeron is a small village west of Felinfach on the A482 between Lampeter and Aberaeron, Ceredigion, Wales. It is part of the constituent community of Llanfihangel Ystrad.

== Facilities ==
The church, St Michael's, is in the centre of Ystrad Aeron. It survived as a medieval church until 1877, when it was entirely rebuilt. Theatr Felinfach is located just outside the village, as is the Felin Fach Creamery.

Other facilities in the village include a garage, a shop, a farmers’ co-op, a caravan park, and a pub, The Vale of Aeron. Neuadd Goffa Felinfach Memorial Hall serves both Ystrad Aeron and Felinfach villages.

The Lampeter, Aberayron and New Quay Light Railway line ran through the village. Felin Fach railway station closed in 1951 to passenger services. Initially it was named Ystrad. General freight ceased in 1963, and milk traffic in 1973.

== Dylan Thomas ==
The Vale of Aeron pub was frequented by Dylan Thomas and his wife, Caitlin Thomas, when they lived at Plas Gelli in nearby Talsarn in the early 1940s. The landlord then was Thomas Vaughan, whose son has described how Dylan and Caitlin used to walk across the fields to visit the pub. Dylan and Caitlin’s Pub Walk: Talsarn to Ystrad Aeron is published in the Dylan Thomas Trail. The pub, now run as a village cooperative, received a £300,000 grant in 2023 to enable renovations and support its long-term future.

== John Davies ==
The bookbinder and poet, John Davies (Shôn Dafydd y Crydd) 1722–1799, is buried in St Michael's graveyard. His grave is directly behind the wooden bench by the church door. The inscription on the grave reads:

"Beneath this stone lies John alone
Cordwainer, scribe, Musician,
Poet sublime in blank and Rhime,
Devine and Politician."

John Davies’ diary with poems for 1 January 1796 to 19 December 1799 is in the National Library of Wales. It is available online. There is also a summary of its contents available, as well as two newspaper reports and a journal article.
