= Felinfach, Ceredigion =

Village in Ceredigion, Wales

Coordinates: 52.179°N 4.1523°W

Felinfach
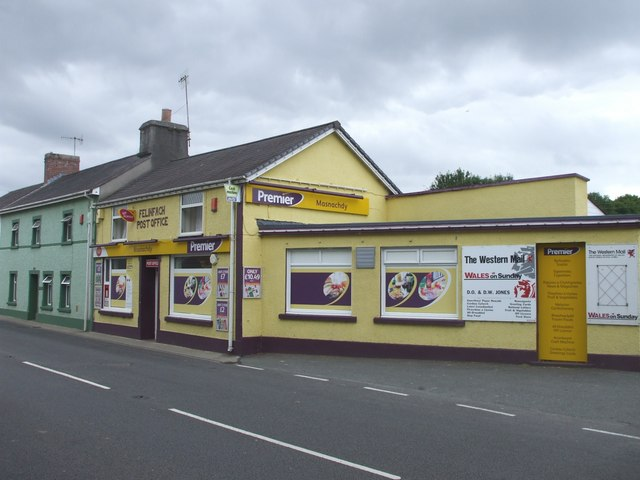
- Felinfach Post Office

- Location within Ceredigion
- Community: Llanfihangel Ystrad
- Principal area: Ceredigion
- Preserved county: Ceredigion
- Country: Wales
- Sovereign state: United Kingdom
- Police: Dyfed-Powys
- Fire: Mid and West Wales
- Ambulance: Welsh
- UK Parliament: Ceredigion Preseli
- Senedd Cymru – Welsh Parliament: Ceredigion Penfro

Felinfach (Welsh for 'little mill') is a village in the community of Llanfihangel Ystrad, Ceredigion. It is situated roughly halfway between Aberaeron and Lampeter, on the A482 road, overlooking the River Aeron.

It was formerly served by Felin Fach railway station on the Lampeter, Aberayron and New Quay Light Railway.

The village has a school, Ysgol Felinfach. The village is also the location of a whey processing factory, now owned by Arla Foods Ingredients, which plans to make it a global production hub.

There is also a football club, C.P.D. Felinfach, which plays in the Ceredigion League.
