= Felin Fach railway station =

Former railway station in Wales

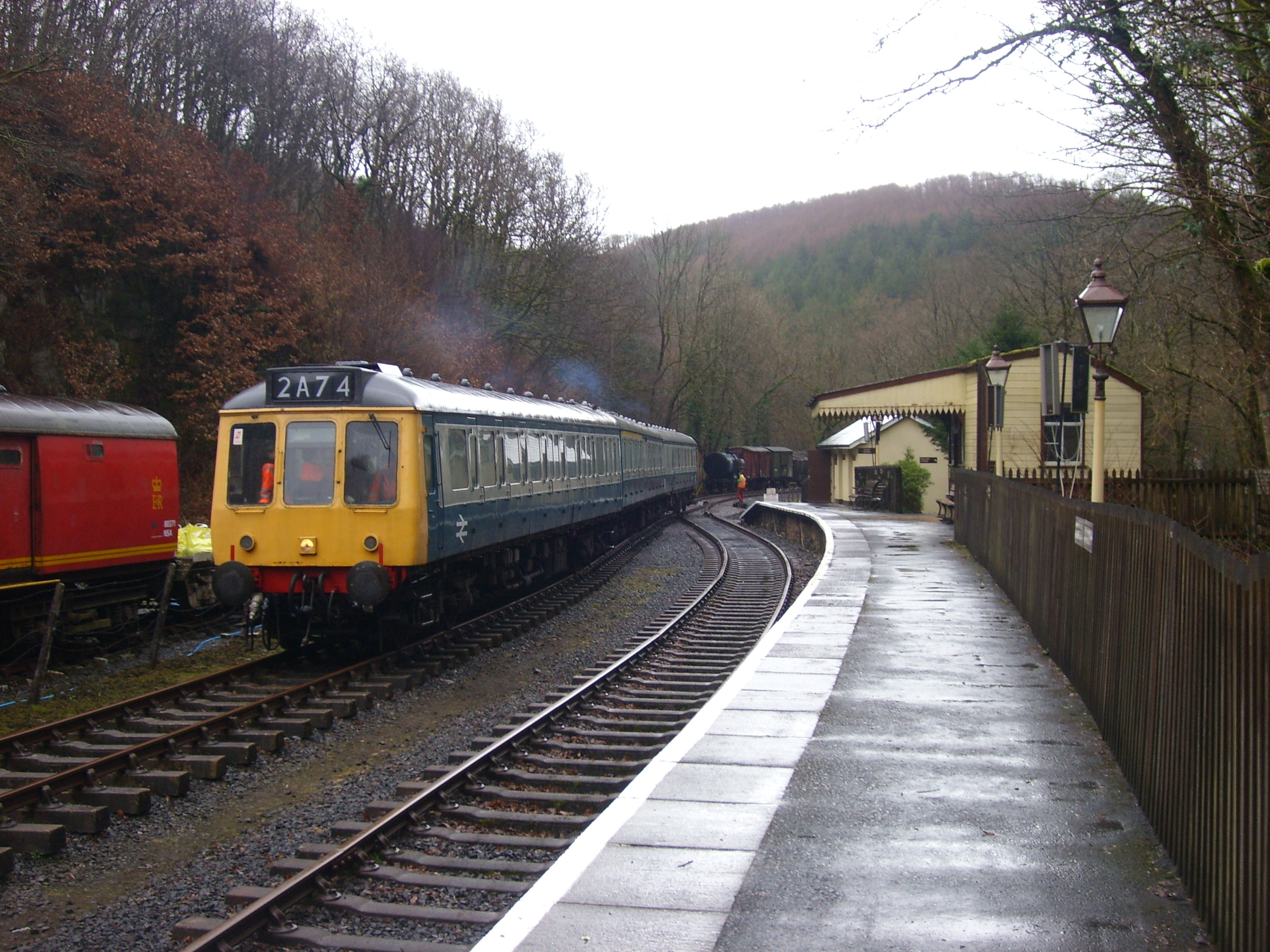
- Felin Fach station building at Llwyfan Cerrig

General information
- Location: Felinfach, Ceredigion; Wales
- Coordinates: 52.1839°N 4.1562°W
- Grid reference: SN5276056065
- Platforms: 2

Other information
- Status: Disused

History
- Original company: Lampeter, Aberayron and New Quay Light Railway
- Pre-grouping: Lampeter, Aberayron and New Quay Light Railway
- Post-grouping: Great Western Railway

Key dates
- 12 May 1911: Ystrad station opens
- 1 January 1913: Renamed Felin Fach
- 12 February 1951: Station closed (last train)
- 7 May 1951: Station closed (official)
- 1963: Closed for general goods traffic
- 1 October 1973: Line closed for milk traffic
- Summer 1975: Track lifted
Location

Felin Fach or Ystrad was a small railway station in the rural location between Ystrad Aeron and Felinfach, the intermediate station on the Aberayron branch of the Carmarthen to Aberystwyth Line in the Welsh county of Ceredigion. Opened by the Lampeter, Aberayron and New Quay Light Railway, the branch to Aberayron diverged from the through line at Lampeter.

== History ==
The branch was incorporated into the Great Western Railway during the Grouping of 1923, passing on to the Western Region of British Railways on nationalisation in 1948. Passenger services were discontinued in 1951, general freight in 1963 and milk traffic in 1973. The station had a passing loop as shown by OS maps.

The Felin Fach station building survives on the Gwili Railway, having been dismantled and re-erected at Llwyfan Cerrig by volunteer rail enthusiasts.

Preceding station	Disused railways	Following station
Talsarn	Great Western Railway; Lampeter, Aberayron and New Quay Light Railway	Ciliau-Aeron
