= Blaenplwyf Halt railway station =

Disused railway station in Ceredigion, Wales

Blaenplwyf Halt
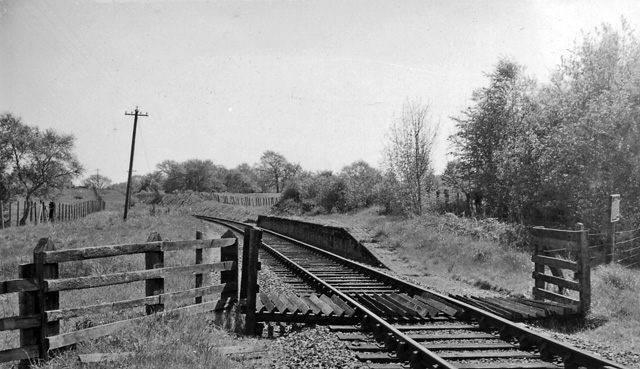
- Blaenplwyf Halt in June 1962.

General information
- Location: Blaenplwyf, Ceredigion; Wales
- Coordinates: 52.1663°N 4.0965°W
- Grid reference: SN5670754032
- Platforms: 1

Other information
- Status: Disused

History
- Original company: Lampeter, Aberayron and New Quay Light Railway
- Pre-grouping: Lampeter, Aberayron and New Quay Light Railway
- Post-grouping: Great Western Railway

Key dates
- 12 May 1911: Station opens
- 12 February 1951: Station closes (last train)
- 7 May 1951: Station closes (official)
- 1963: Line closed for general freight
- 1 October 1973: Line closes for milk traffic
- Summer 1975: Track lifted
Location

Blaenplwyf Halt railway station was a small railway station in a very rural location, the second stop after the junction for the Aberayron branch of the Carmarthen to Aberystwyth Line in the Welsh county of Ceredigion. Opened by the Lampeter, Aberayron and New Quay Light Railway, the branch to Aberayron diverged from the through line at Lampeter.

== History ==
The branch was incorporated into the Great Western Railway during the Grouping of 1923, passing on to the Western Region of British Railways on nationalisation in 1948. Passenger services were discontinued in 1951, general freight in 1963 and milk traffic in 1973. The single platform does not survive; like most of the others it was built from wooden railway sleepers.

== Notes ==
Preceding station	Disused railways	Following station
Silian	Great Western Railway; Lampeter, Aberayron and New Quay Light Railway	Talsarn
