= Aeron Express =

The Aeron Express was the name used for a hand-powered aerial cable ferry that was built to ferry people across the harbour in the West Wales coastal town of Aberaeron. The ferry was first built in 1880 to ferry labourers from the Liverpool quay on Quay Parade, to the Birkenhead quay on Lon Yr Hafen, in the absence of a bridge across the River Aeron.

== History ==
The original transport, on the principle of the flying fox, was constructed by Captain John Evans in 1885, after a flood had destroyed the former road bridge. The single-seat carriage was enlarged to carry two people, and later four or more. It operated well into the twentieth century and was eventually replaced with a footbridge.

=== 20th-century reproduction ===
The ferry was re-created by the then-owner of Aberystwyth Cliff Railway Clr Bob Griffin (ex Mayor of Aberystwyth) in 1987, predominantly as a tourist attraction, and ran until 1994.

During this period, the ferry ran from the Easter bank holiday weekend until the end of September (the traditionally busy times of year for Aberaeron). On either quay, a hexagonal wooden hut housed sales of tickets and merchandise for the ferry. At the end of the season, the ferry and supporting structures were dismantled and stored for the winter in the nearby village of Llanon.

The ferry utilised a single supporting steel cable that bore the weight of the carriage, with a looped drive cable that was driven by two hand-powered wheels, one at each side of the harbour. At peak times, operators were placed at both sides to wind the carriage, but it was attended by a single operator during quieter parts of the summer tourist season.

Limited by the strength of the operator, the modern-day version could carry up to four men at a time. Tourists often believed it was powered by a hidden electric motor, or that it went to destinations other than the other side of the harbour.

When the main cable was tensioned, it prevented access to the inner harbour for boats with high masts, and had to be lowered on occasion to allow yachts to enter and leave the inner harbour.

The ferry was featured in an HTV program in 1993, presented by Siân Lloyd. This footage was used again in an HTV program 'Stories from the street' in approximately 2003. At the 2007 Aberaeron Carnival, the 1990s carriage body was paraded as a float attraction, but it has not been seen in public since.

Although the ferry remained disused as of January 2013, the substantial reinforced concrete footings were still in place on the Liverpool quay, and directly opposite on the Birkenhead quay. The possibility of resurrecting the Aeron Express as a tourist attraction is a regular topic of conversation in the local community.
