= Harbourmaster Hotel =

Hotel in Aberaeron, Ceredigion, Wales

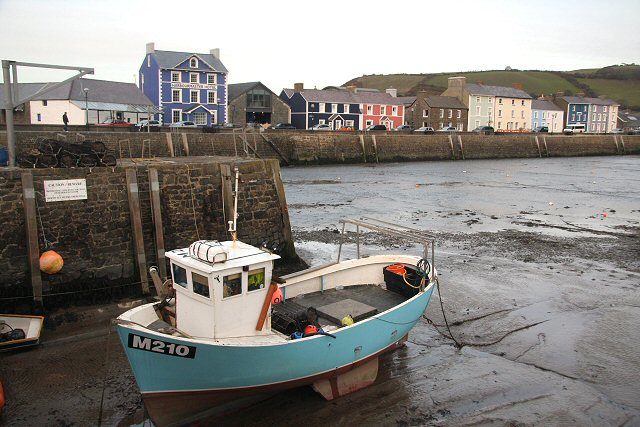
- The hotel can be seen across the harbour on the left

- Location within Ceredigion

General information
- Location: Aberaeron, Ceredigion, Wales
- Coordinates: 52°14′36″N 4°15′47″W

Harbourmaster Hotel is a Grade II listed boutique hotel on the quay in the coastal town of Aberaeron, Ceredigion, west Wales. It is located in a distinctive French blue painted building, formerly the harbourmaster's home and later a whaler's inn, dating from 1811. The hotel, noted for its seafood restaurant, is especially lively during the annual Aberaeron Seafood Festival. The Good Hotel Guide awarded it a Cesar Award in 2005.

== See also ==
- List of seafood restaurants
