= New Quay =

Seaside town in Ceredigion, Wales

New Quay: Welsh: Ceinewydd
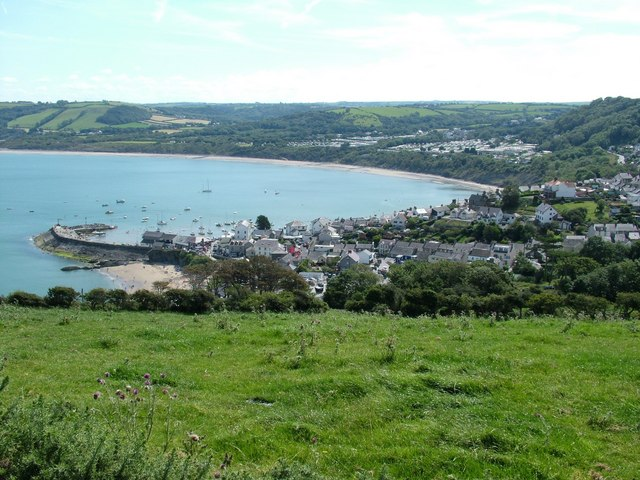
- New Quay

- Location within Ceredigion
- Population: 1,045 (2021)
  - Cardiff: 90 mi (140 km)SE
- Principal area: Ceredigion
- Preserved county: Dyfed
- Country: Wales
- Sovereign state: United Kingdom
- Post town: NEW QUAY
- Postcode district: SA4
- Dialling code: 01545
- Police: Dyfed-Powys
- Fire: Mid and West Wales
- Ambulance: Welsh
- UK Parliament: Ceredigion Preseli
- Senedd Cymru – Welsh Parliament: Ceredigion Penfro
- List of places UK Wales Ceredigion 52.214°N 4.360°W Community map: Map of the community

New Quay (Welsh: Cei Newydd, standardised as Ceinewydd) is a seaside town, community and electoral ward in Ceredigion, Wales; it had a resident population of 1,045 at the 2021 census. Located 19 miles (31 km) south-west of Aberystwyth, on Cardigan Bay with a harbour and large sandy beaches, the town lies on the Ceredigion Coast Path and the Wales Coast Path. It remains a popular seaside resort and traditional fishing town, with strong family and literary associations with the poet Dylan Thomas and his play, Under Milk Wood.

== History ==
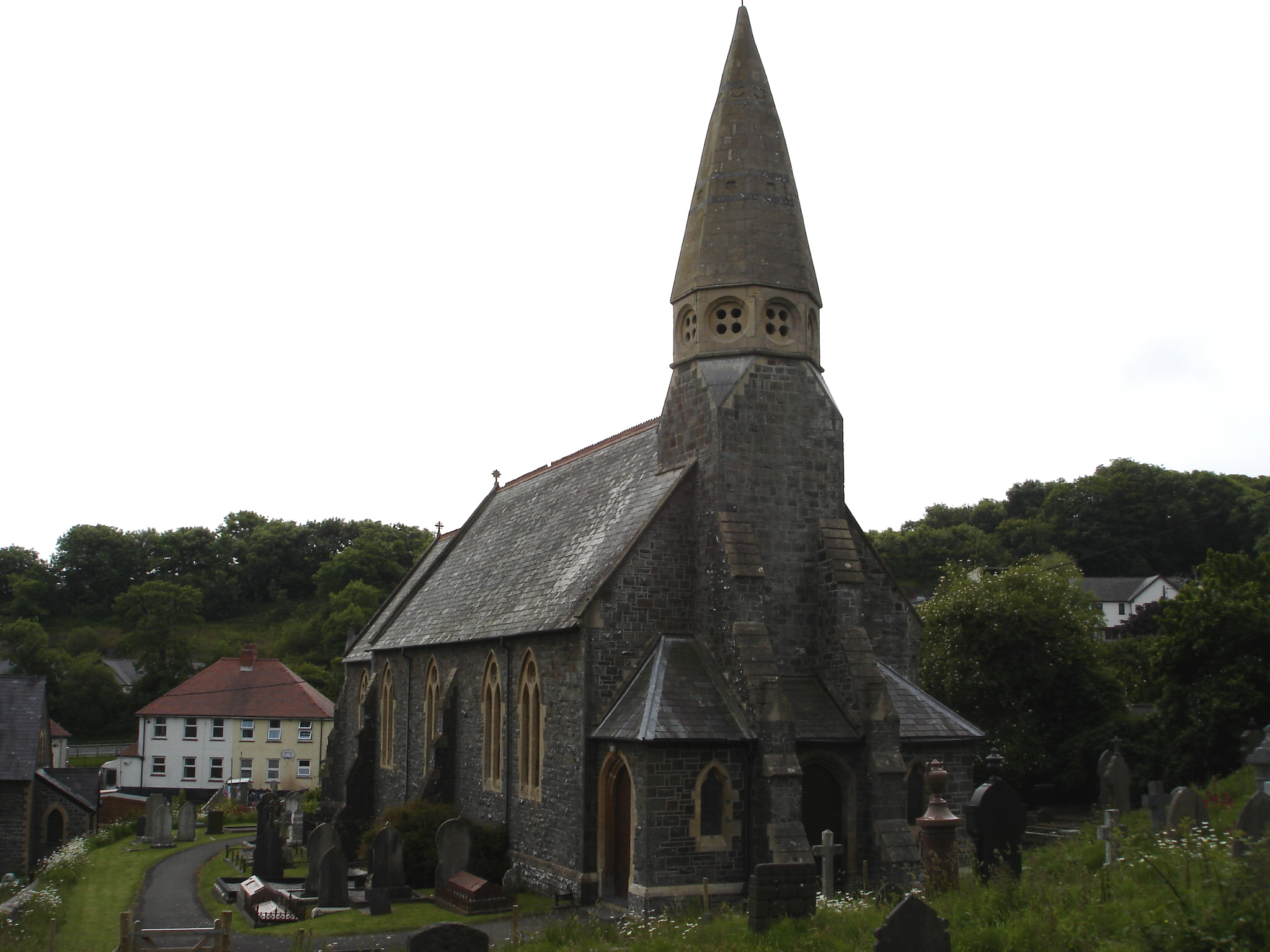
St Llwchaiarn's Church

Until the early 19th century, New Quay consisted of a few thatched cottages surrounded by agricultural land, the natural harbour providing a safe mooring for fishing boats and a few small trading vessels. The New Quay Harbour Act was passed in 1834 and a stone pier was constructed at a cost of £4,700. Trading activity increased and new houses were built as economic migrants arrived. As shipbuilding started up, the town increased in size with the construction of terraced housing up the slopes of the sheltered bay.

By the 1840s, more than three hundred men were employed in building ships in three centres: New Quay itself; Traethgwyn, a bay just to the north; and Cei-bach, a pebble beach further north below a wooded cliff. Here were constructed not only smacks and schooners for sailing along the coast, but also larger vessels for sailing to the Americas and Australia. At that time, as well as shipwrights, New Quay had half a dozen blacksmith shops, three sail makers, three ropeworks and a foundry. Most of the men of the town were mariners or employed in occupations linked with the sea. Several of the old warehouses remain, having been put to new uses. Lengths of chain, metal rings and capstans, and a list of tolls for exports and imports can still be seen outside the harbourmaster's office.

By 1870, shipbuilding had ceased at New Quay but most of the men living there still went to sea. There were navigation schools in the town and many of the last square riggers that sailed the world were captained by New Quay men. Between 1850 and 1927, the Board of Trade issued 1,380 Merchant Master and Mate certificates to New Quay men compared, for example, with 21 certificates to Laugharne men and five to Ferryside men.

In 1907, a local newspaper noted that "New Quay...has more retired sea captains living in it than any other place of its own size in Wales." At the 1939 War Register, there were 58 sailors living in New Quay, of whom 30 were master mariners, compared with four living in Laugharne and one in Ferryside.

The historian S.C. Passmore has noted the "zeal for learning" that was present in New Quay. This was reflected in the opening of a Newspaper Reading Room in 1854, later incorporating a Lloyds Lending Library.

One of the first guides for tourists was published in 1885 by the Welsh Press: Guide to New Quay: Being a short description of New Quay as a watering-place.

The 1904-1905 Welsh revival began in New Quay. The three chapels in the town are Bethel, Tabernacle and Towyn; the two churches are Llanllwchaearn Church at the top of the town and St. Ina Church at Llanina on the eastern end of the bay. Coronation Gardens, at the bottom of the town next to the pier, were created in 1911 to mark the coronation of George V.

A Memorial Hall was built on Towyn Road in 1925 in memory of those killed in the First World War. Pupils from the London Nautical School were evacuated to New Quay during the Second World War and billeted around the town in residents' homes and hotels. (Note: See also a letter from Dylan Thomas to Donald Taylor, 26 October 1944, in which he notes he had been asked to find films for the pupils.)

There were 877 residents in New Quay shown on the Register of Electors in May 1945. Of these, 587 were women and 290 were men, figures that partly reflect the number of New Quay men, most of them sailors, who were killed in the First and Second World Wars.

The post-war history of New Quay is largely that of the emergence of the town as an attractive holiday destination.

== Governance ==
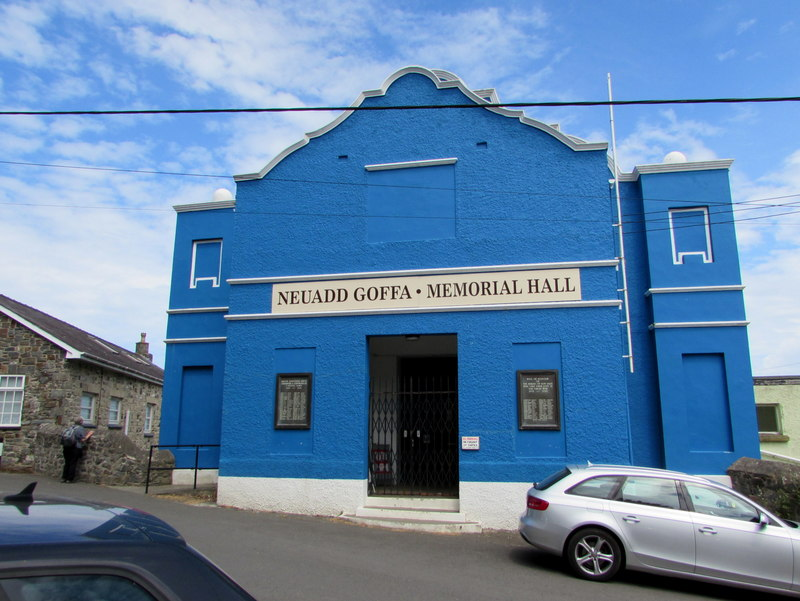
Memorial Hall, Towyn Road

There are two tiers of local government covering New Quay, at community (town) and county level: New Quay Town Council (Cyngor Tref Cei Newydd) and Ceredigion County Council (Cyngor Sir Ceredigion). The town council meets at the Memorial Hall on Towyn Road.

=== Administrative history ===
New Quay historically formed part of the parish of Llanllwchaiarn. A New Quay local government district was created in 1869, covering New Quay with the old village of Llanllwchaiarn around the parish church, but excluding the more rural parts of the parish. Such local government districts were converted into urban districts under the Local Government Act 1894.

The 1894 Act also directed that parishes could no longer straddle district boundaries, and so a new civil parish of New Quay was created matching the urban district, and the parish of Llanllwchaiarn was reduced to just cover the parts outside the urban district, despite Llanllwchaiarn village itself being within the New Quay urban district and parish.

New Quay Urban District was abolished in 1974 under the Local Government Act 1972. A community called New Quay was created instead, covering the area of the abolished urban district. District-level functions passed to Ceredigion District Council, which was in turn replaced in 1996 by Ceredigion County Council.

== Tourism and attractions ==
Key attractions for holidaymakers include the harbour and sandy beaches, as well as opportunities such as boat trips to see the population of bottlenose dolphins that lives in Cardigan Bay. The town has a heritage centre and marine wildlife centre. The outskirts of the town feature many large holiday parks and caravan sites.

The annual Cardigan Bay Regatta, usually in August, has been conducted since at least the 1870s. Events now include inshore sports (Note: Sports include swimming and rowing.) and dinghy and cruiser racing.

There are beach walks and cliff walks along the coastal path, south to Llangrannog and north to Aberaeron.

The National Trust's Llanerchaeron estate is located nearby, as is the 18th century Ty Glyn Walled Garden in Ciliau Aeron. The Neolithic Pentre Ifan Burial Chamber and the Castell Henllys Iron Age Village are located near to the town. Restored steam engines on the Vale of Rheidol Railway leave from nearby Aberystwyth, on the scenic route to Devil's Bridge.

== Amenities ==
New Quay has a large primary school, a doctors' surgery, a small branch of the county library service, a fire station and a Memorial Hall. There is also a public park at the top of New Quay, next to the tennis court.

New Quay Bowling Club is on Francis Street, at the top of the town. New Quay Golf Club first appeared in 1909, but closed in the 1920s; the nearest today is Cardigan Golf Club.

In addition to the hospitality industry, there is still significant employment in sea fishing and fish processing.

New Quay Lifeboat Station, operated by the RNLI, houses two lifeboats. In 2014, the station celebrated 150 years of service, during which period it made 940 callouts.

== Transport ==
Public transport is provided by Richards Brothers, which operates the T5 TrawsCymru bus route to Aberaeron, Aberystwyth, Cardigan, Fishguard and Haverfordwest.

The town has never been served by a railway, as schemes to open routes to Cardigan or Newcastle Emlyn were abandoned in the 1860s; the Lampeter, Aberayron and New Quay Light Railway was never completed, due to the First World War. The nearest National Rail station is at Aberystwyth, 23 miles (37 km) away.

== Plas Llanina ==
Plas Llanina is a mile or so to the north of New Quay on the cliffs above Traethgwyn and Cei Bach beaches. It is considered a good example of a small-scale, post-medieval gentry house. It has a chequered history, including some interesting owners and various stories associated with them. It belonged to the Musgrave family from around 1630. By the end of the 18th century, it had passed into the ownership of the Jones family, the last of whom was Edward Warren Jones. When he died, he left the Llanina Estate to his two godchildren, Mrs Charlotte Lloyd (of Coedmore) and her younger brother, Charles Richard Longcroft.

The house remained with the Longcrofts until about 1920, its last owner being Air Vice Marshal Sir Charles Alexander Holcombe Longcroft (1883–1958), who had been born and brought up at Llanina. He is considered to be a founding father of the Royal Air Force.

Sometime in the late 1930s, the house and grounds were rented by Lord Howard de Walden as a summer residence. In the late 1940s, it was bought by Colonel J.J. Davis and Betty Davis, who later moved to Ty Glyn in Ciliau Aeron. By 1964, Plas Llanina was derelict. It was subsequently bought in 1988 and rebuilt by a London banker.

The house lies next to the church of Saint Ina, with a public footpath to both the church and the beach.

== Dylan Thomas ==
Dylan and Caitlin Thomas lived in New Quay from September 1944 until July 1945, (Note: The dates are evident from Thomas's letters.) renting a cliff-top bungalow called Majoda.

It stood, said Thomas, "in a really wonderful bit of the bay, with a beach of its own. Terrific. Made of wood and asbestos, Majoda's facilities were basic: it had no mains electricity, gas or water, and the lavatory and a water tap were both outside; Thomas also refers to his "wood-and-asbestos pagoda" in his letter-poem of 1 September 1944 in Collected Letters. It was, wrote Caitlin, "cheaply primitive" and they were there during one of the coldest Cardiganshire winters on record.

There were several other families from Swansea living in New Quay, who had come after the city's bombing of in February 1941, including the historian and artist Myra Evans (1883-1972). (Note: Elmira ("Myra") Evans was the daughter of Captain Thomas and Mary Rees of New Quay.) She was a local historian and artist, who had also written a children's operetta; her portrait of Dylan Thomas has been published. Her husband, Evan Jenkin Evans (1882-1944), had been professor of physics at Swansea University since 1920. Thomas's Swansea friend and distant cousin, Vera Killick, lived next to Majoda in Ffynnonfeddyg cottage, whilst her sister, Evelyn Milton, lived further along the cliff top in Traethina.

Vera and Evelyn's mother, Margaret Phillips, had been born in Llanarth, the next village to New Quay. Thomas also had an aunt in Swansea and four cousins in New Quay, who had lived there since the 1920s; (Note: The aunt was Elizabeth Ann Williams, née Evans, who had married John Williams (1864-1911), the brother of Dylan’s mother, Florence. Elizabeth left Swansea to live in New Quay in the 1920s, together with her daughter, Theodosia (b.1904), who was Dylan's first cousin. Theodosia married a master mariner, Thomas Legg, in 1930. Their three children, Margaret, Anne and George Legg (b.1932), were brought up in New Quay, in a house called Wendawel, which is now part of the Dylan Thomas Trail around the town.) Thomas Legg's parents, Captain George Legg OBE and his wife, Margaret, also lived in the town. George and Margaret are to be found in the 1945 Register of Electors for New Quay, as is their daughter-in-law, Theodosia. A more distant relative, the First World War fighter pilot ace, James Ira Thomas Jones, also known as Ira Taffy Jones, who lived his wife Olive in Tylegwyn for much of the Second World War. (Note: An interview with Olive is available.)

Thomas had previously visited New Quay in the 1930s, and then again in 1942–3 when he and Caitlin had lived a few miles away at Plas Gelli, Talsarn. (Note: Plas Gelli is a Grade II listed building. The house was built in the 1680s, with a four-room cross-wing added in the late 18th century.) Dylan and Caitlin lived in Plas Gelli with Vera Killick, Evelyn Milton and their mother, Margaret Phillips. His New Quay pub poem, "Sooner than you can water milk" dates from this period, as does his script for the filming of Cardigan Bay for the final part of Wales - Green Mountain, Black Mountain. The film comes to an end with a panoramic sweep of Cardigan Bay from Pengraig cliff above New Quay, followed by a shot of Carreg Walltog rock on the shore below.

One of Thomas's patrons was Thomas Scott-Ellis, 8th Baron Howard de Walden, whose summer residence was Plas Llanina, an historic manor house perched on the cliffs at Cei Bach, just a short walk away from Majoda. He encouraged Thomas to use the old apple house at the bottom of the manor's walled garden as a quiet place in which to write. It would have been an inspirational setting, and one Dylan Thomas scholar has suggested that the stories about Llanina's drowned houses and cemetery are "the literal truth that inspired the imaginative and poetic truth" of Under Milk Wood. Another important aspect of that literal truth was the 60 acres of cliff-top between Majoda and New Quay that fell into the sea in the early 1940s.

New Quay, said Caitlin, was exactly Thomas's kind of place, "with the ocean in front of him...and a pub where he felt at home in the evenings." (Note: The pub was the Black Lion; he was happy there, as his letters reveal.) His ten months at Majoda were the most fertile period of his adult life, "a second flowering" said his first biographer, Constantine FitzGibbon, "with a great outpouring of poems." These Majoda poems, including making a start on Fern Hill, provided nearly half the poems of Deaths and Entrances, published in 1946. (Note: Further work was done on Fern Hill in July and August 1945 at Blaencwm, the family cottage in Carmarthenshire. A draft of the poem was sent to David Tennant on 28 August 1945 Fern Hill received its first publication in Horizon magazine in October 1945.)

There were four film scripts as well, and a radio script, Quite Early One Morning, about a walk around New Quay. This radio script was described by Professor Walford Davies as "a veritable storehouse of phrases, rhythms and details later resurrected or modified for Under Milk Wood." (Note: For example, the “done-by-hand water colours” of Quite Early One Morning appear later as First Voice's “watercolours done by hand” in Under Milk Wood.) Not since his late teenage years had Thomas written so much. His second biographer, Paul Ferris, concluded that "on the grounds of output, the bungalow deserves a plaque of its own." Thomas's third biographer, George Tremlett, concurred, describing the time in New Quay as "one of the most creative periods of Thomas's life."

New Quay is often cited as an inspiration for the village of Llareggub in Under Milk Wood. Walford Davies, for example, has concluded that New Quay "was crucial in supplementing the gallery of characters Thomas had to hand for writing Under Milk Wood." FitzGibbon had come to a similar conclusion, noting that "Llareggub resembles New Quay more closely [than Laugharne] and many of the characters derive from that seaside village in Cardiganshire..." Writing in January 1954, just days before the first BBC broadcast of the play, its producer, Douglas Cleverdon, noted that Thomas "wrote the first half within a few months; then his inspiration seemed to fail him when he left New Quay..." One of Thomas's closest friends, Ivy Williams of Brown's Hotel, Laugharne, has said "Of course, it wasn't really written in Laugharne at all. It was written in New Quay, most of it." (Note: Ivy’s husband, Ebie, also recalls visiting New Quay on several occasions, staying in the Black Lion (p.187).) Jack Patrick Evans, landlord of the Black Lion in New Quay, has provided an account of Thomas gathering material for the play in the pub: "...he seemed to do his best writing among us local people – he was always with a pad on his knees... Always busy, making notes of any local characters who came in."

Thomas produced a sketch of the fictional town and evidence states that "Thomas's drawing of Llareggub is...based on New Quay." It was revealed that Thomas used the name of an actual New Quay resident, Cherry Jones, for one of the people living in Cockle Street. (Note: In 1933, Dan Jones, a general builder, married Phyllis Cherry, the daughter of Walter and Edith Cherry of Margaret Street; Dan, Phyllis and her parents are all registered. Walter Cherry was a town councillor, magistrate and a Black Lion regular.)

Thomas also drew upon other New Quay residents, including Mrs Ogmore Davies and Mrs Pritchard-Jones, both of Church Street, whose names when combined produce Llareggub's Mrs Ogmore-Pritchard. (Note: Annie Davies was the wife of Thomas Ogmore Davies whose drapery shop, Bon Marché, stood at the top of Church Street, next to the Queens Hotel. Eluned Pritchard-Jones was the wife of Barclays bank manager, Richard, at Bank House in Church Street.) (Note: The Under Milk Wood article draws on an account of Mrs Pritchard-Jones provided by her daughter.)

Jack Lloyd Evans, a New Quay postman and the town crier, (Note: It was noted that the “tradition of a town crier persisted down to the 1950s, the last crier being Jack Lloyd.”) (Note: In her book on New Quay, former resident, Catrin Edwards-Jones, gives examples of the local news that Jack Lloyd would cry out forthcoming local events, such as a concert or a meeting in the Memorial Hall also lived on Church Street.) (Note: He lived at Noddfa (now Trenova) at the top end of Church Street, opposite the Queens Hotel.) provided the character of Llareggub's postman, Willy Nilly, whose practice of opening letters, and spreading the news, reflects Lloyd's role as Town Crier, as Thomas himself noted: "Nobody minds him opening the letters and acting as [a] kind of town-crier. How else could they know the news?" This worksheet note, together with our knowledge that Thomas knew Jack Lloyd ("an old friend"), (Note: "Jack the Post is an old friend...” from a letter to Margaret Taylor, 29 August 1946, in the Collected Letters.) make the link between Lloyd and Llareggub's Willy Nilly.

There were also other New Quay people in the play, including Dai Fred Davies, the donkeyman on board the fishing vessel, the Alpha. He appears in the play as Tom-Fred the donkeyman. (Note: Dai Fred was in charge of the donkey engine, an auxiliary engine used for work such as lifting and pumping. He is mentioned in Thomas' letter to Margaret Taylor of 29 August 1946 (Collected Letters).) Other residents are included anonymously; Fourth Drowned's question "Buttermilk and whippets?" is a good example: Jack Patrick, landlord of the Black Lion, kept whippets and made buttermilk in his dairy next to the hotel. (Note: The information about Jack Patrick’s dairy came from his niece, Ann Brodie, and from a New Quay resident, Eleanor Lister. More information available in the book's index.)

At the beginning of the play Third Drowned, he asks: "How's the tenors in Dowlais?" The question reflects the close relationship that once existed between New Quay and Dowlais, an industrial town in the South Wales valleys. Its workers traditionally came to New Quay for their holidays and often sang on the pier on summer evenings. Such was the relationship between the two towns that when St Mair's church in Dowlais was demolished in 1963, its bell was given to New Quay's parish church.

Other names and features from New Quay in the play include Maesgwyn Farm, (Note: In "Fourth Drowned: Who milks the cows in Maesgwyn?", Maesgwyn's fields were on the cliff top between Majoda and New Quay.) (Note: There is a photo of Maesgwyn on p.468.) the Sailor's Home Arms, (Note: Always known as the Sailor's Arms locally, in newspaper reports and in some census returns.) the river Dewi, (Note: Ffynnon Ddewi (Dewi’s Well); it supplied the town’s water until the 1930s and flows into the sea nearby.) the quarry (Note: Frondolau quarry at the end of Rock Street and Neuadd quarry on the headland above. As with Llareggub's Mr Waldo and Mrs Beattie Morris up in the quarry, New Quay’s Frondolau quarry had long been a favourite spot for couples, as the New Quay Chronicle had once reported, “Should Cupid pierce the tender hearts of the lovely maidens and brave young men, the quarry and the lonely cliffs form an unapproachable fortress to guard their faltering confessions.” August 1902.) and the harbour. (Note: New Quay's harbour and pier date from the early 19th century.)

Laugharne's harbour had vanished under saltmarsh and silt long before Thomas's time. Ever since the 17th century, “…the incremental growth of the salt marsh deprived the town of both beach and harbour and landlocked its castle.” Manchester House, (Note: Manchester House on Margaret Street was a draper and milliner’s shop, as it is in Llareggub but not in Laugharne, where it was a general store. Thomas mentions Manchester House in his broadcast, Quite Early One Morning.) the hill of windows (Note: First Voice: “The windy town is a hill of windows…..”) and the Downs. (Note: Llareggub had Donkey Down, as well as Donkey Street and Donkey Lane.) In New Quay, the Downs was an area of steep grassland that stretched down from the Black Lion to the lifeboat station; it was used for grazing donkeys, including Maisie, the Black Lion’s donkey. Thomas refers to the braying of donkeys in a letter from Majoda of 21 May 1945.

Llareggub's occupational profile as a town of seafarers, fishermen, cocklers and farmers has been examined through an analysis of the 1939 War Register, comparing the returns for New Quay with those for Laugharne, Ferryside and Llansteffan. It shows that New Quay and Ferryside provide by far the best fit with Llareggub's occupational profile.

The writer and puppeteer Walter Wilkinson visited New Quay in 1947; his essay on the town captures its character and atmosphere as Thomas would have found it two years earlier.

Much of the location filming for The Edge of Love, a 2008 film based around Thomas and Caitlin's friendship with Vera Killick, was carried out in and around New Quay. It starred Sienna Miller, Keira Knightley, Matthew Rhys and Cillian Murphy. The film, said the scriptwriter Sharman Macdonald, was a work of fiction: it was "not true, it's surmise on my part, it's a fiction… I made it up." One incident in the film that Macdonald did not make up was the shooting at Majoda in March 1945, after which Vera's husband, William Killick, was charged with attempted murder and later acquitted. (Note: See chapter 4.)

Thomas and his family left New Quay in July 1945. He continued to refer to the town in future broadcasts, including in 1949's Living in Wales. (Note: "Hoofed with seaweed, did a jig on the Llanina sands...")

The Dylan Thomas Trail runs through Ceredigion, in west Wales, with a published walking guide available. It was opened officially by Dylan and Caitlin's daughter, Aeronwy Thomas, in July 2003. The trail is marked by blue plaques, with information boards in New Quay, Lampeter and Aberaeron.

== Notable people ==
- Towyn Jones (1858–1925), clergyman, politician and MP for Carmarthenshire East and later Llanelli
- John Tywi Jones (1870-1948), Baptist minister and journalist
- Elizabeth Mary Jones (‘Moelona', 1877–1953), teacher, novelist and translator, including the works of Alphonse Daudet
- Florrie Evans, (1884–1967) a local resident and daughter of a New Quay seaman, is reported to have started the 1904 Welsh Christian revival in New Quay; she went on to be a preacher and a missionary to India
- Geraint Bowen, (1915–2011), Welsh language poet, academic and political campaigner
- Dill Jones (1923–1984), a jazz stride pianist
- Samantha Wynne-Rhydderch (b.1966), poet
- Francesca Rhydderch (b.1969), writer and academic
- Ryan Andrews (b. 1981), film director, music video director and production designer
