= Talsarn =

Hamlet in Ceredigion, Wales

Coordinates: 52.1859°N 4.1292°W

Tal-sarn
- Location within Ceredigion
- OS grid reference: SN545563
  - Cardiff: 64 mi (103 km)
  - London: 178 mi (286 km)
- Community: Nantcwnlle
- Principal area: Ceredigion
- Country: Wales
- Sovereign state: United Kingdom
- Post town: Aberaeron
- Postcode district: SA48
- Police: Dyfed-Powys
- Fire: Mid and West Wales
- Ambulance: Welsh
- UK Parliament: Ceredigion Preseli
- Senedd Cymru – Welsh Parliament: Ceredigion Penfro

Talsarn is a hamlet in the community of Nantcwnlle, Ceredigion, Wales. It lies some 16 miles (26 km) south of Aberystwyth, 64 miles (103 km) north-west of Cardiff, and 178 miles (286 km) from London. It is situated almost half-way between the towns of Lampeter and Aberaeron on the Ceredigion coast. The River Aeron passes close to Talsarn as it makes its way to the sea at Aberaeron.

Notable archaeological discoveries have been made in the district, including Stone Age tools and a medieval convent, cemetery and Tudor mansion.

Talsarn boasts four mansions in its vicinity: Llanllyr, Abermeurig, Plas Trefilan and Plas Gelli, as well as Ty Mawr, a substantial 17th C. farmhouse which sits at the centre of the hamlet, and Trefilan Castle “a strong castle mound that can be associated with a princely house” of the medieval period. Little remains of the castle, except its mound, which is close to St. Hilary's parish church in Trefilan.

Capel Hermon Methodist Chapel lies outside Talsarn, just off the road from Trefilan to Cilcennin.

The hamlet's name may derive from the Roman road Sarn Helen, which runs nearby, though it's also been noted that where a medieval road crossed soft ground, a "sarn of logs and rushes were required. Places that bear such names as Sarnau, Pensarn and Talsarn denote spots that topographically conform to this description.”

The W00002862 Output Area's (which includes Talsarn) population can be found here:

== Dylan Thomas ==
Plas Gelli is a Grade II listed building, comprising the original Jacobean farmhouse, built in the 1680s, with a four-room cross-wing added to the farmhouse in the late 18th C. The farmyard comprised stabling for four horses, as well as the Ty Pair, the outdoor servants' quarters. Gelli also has a walled garden and an octagonal thatched lodge at the head of the drive, of the kind often associated with John Nash.

The writer and poet Dylan Thomas lived at Gelli from 1941 to 1943, though he was frequently in London during this period. Dylan and his wife Caitlin shared the cross-wing of the house with his childhood friends from Swansea, Vera and Evelyn Phillips. Dylan and Caitlin's daughter, Aeronwy, was named after the river Aeron.

The farmhouse part of the mansion was lived in by Thomas and Mary Davies (who farmed Gelli's 75 acres) and their granddaughter, Amanda Williams, who has provided a vivid account of Dylan's time at Gelli. The journalist, Lyn Ebenezer, has also interviewed Talsarn residents about Dylan's time in the village.

Some of Dylan's colourful letters from Gelli can be found in his Collected Letters. There are also a handful of poems associated with Dylan's residence at Gelli.

In Dylan's time, there were some twenty-six people living in Talsarn itself, whose facilities included a school, shop, garage, post office, blacksmith and the Red Lion pub.

Dylan, Caitlin, Vera and Evelyn left Gelli in 1944 and moved a few miles away to New Quay.

The Dylan Thomas Trail passes through the grounds of the mansion on a public footpath.

== Talsarn poets ==
Talsarn and its hinterland was once the centre of a thriving group of country poets (beirdd y wlad ). They included John Davies (1722–1799), John Jenkins (1825–1894) and his brother Joseph Jenkins (1818–1898), Jenkin Jenkins Felincoed (1845–1892), William Lloyd (d.1911, Llundain Fach), Dinah Davies Tynrhos (1851–1931), David Davies (Perthneuadd) and Dan Jenkins Pentrefelin (1856–1946) Joseph Jenkins also wrote for agricultural journals, as well as writing a book on his travels in Australia.

== Talsarn horses ==
Talsarn hosts the annual Lampeter Stallion Show, established in April 1962, which attracts entries and spectators from far and wide, including mainland Europe. The artist Aneurin Jones has produced a number of works portraying Talsarn horses, such as Sioe Feirch Llambed Talsarn (Lampeter Stallion Show Talsarn) and several other works titled Talsarn, showing both horses and farmers, including Bois Talsarn.

The events of the Talsarn Harness Racing Club are also popular, and attract a regular television audience. The first trotting race in Talsarn was held on 13 April 1876.

== Reading ==
- L. Ebenezer (1967) Dylan at Gelli, Cambrian News, February 24.
- L. Ebenezer (1978) Local interviews on the occasion of the 25th anniversary of Dylan Thomas’ death, Y Cymro, November 7
- Dinah Davies (1912) Llinellau Gwasgaredig, James
- D. Islwyn Edwards (1994) Cerddi Cerngoch, Y Lolfa
- John Jenkins (Cerngoch) (1904) Cerddi Cerngoch, Cwmni y Wasg Eglwysig Gymreig
- Joseph Jenkins (1975) Diary of a Welsh Swagman 1869-1894, Macmillan
- L. Jones (1989) History of Talsarn Show and Fair, Levell and Evans
- A. Leech (2007) Dan Jenkins: A Biography, Y Lolfa.
- D.N. Thomas (2000) Dylan Thomas: A Farm, Two Mansions and a Bungalow, Seren
- D.N. Thomas (2002) The Dylan Thomas Trail, Y Lolfa

== See also ==
- Dylan Thomas Trail
- Talsarn Halt railway station
