= Dylan Thomas Trail =

Walking trail in Ceredigion, Wales

The Dylan Thomas Trail
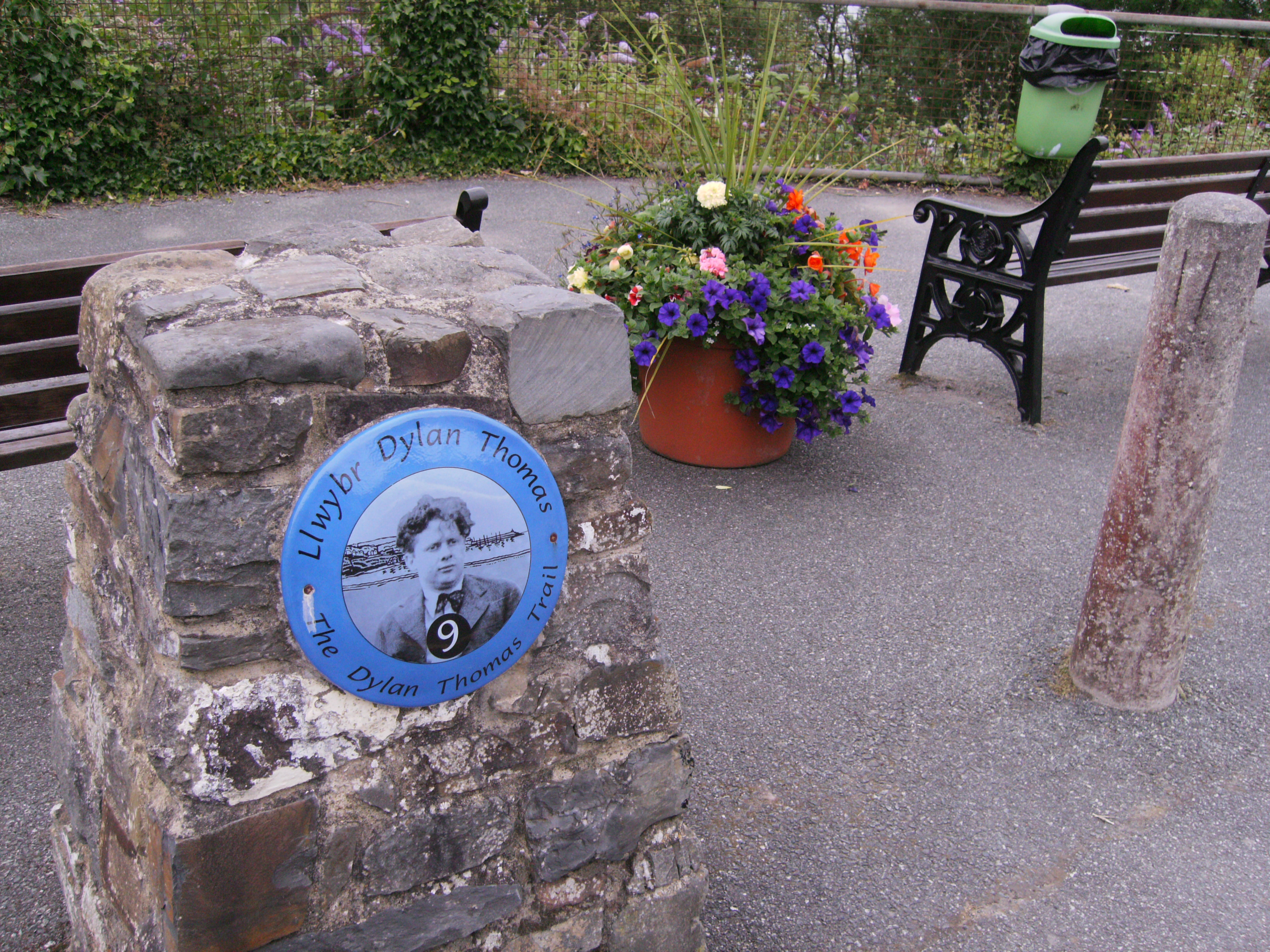
- Dylan Thomas Trail number 9. New Quay
- Location: Ceredigion; 52.2818°N 4.1772°W
- Use: Walking

The Dylan Thomas Trail (Welsh: Llwybr Dylan Thomas) runs through places associated with the poet Dylan Thomas in Ceredigion, west Wales. It was officially opened by Aeronwy Thomas, Dylan's daughter, in July 2003. It also featured in the celebration in 2014 of the centenary of Dylan's birth.

The Trail is marked by blue plaques and information boards in Lampeter, Aberaeron and New Quay. There is also a detailed guide available, The Dylan Thomas Trail, which helps visitors walk the route but also describes the poet's time in the area.

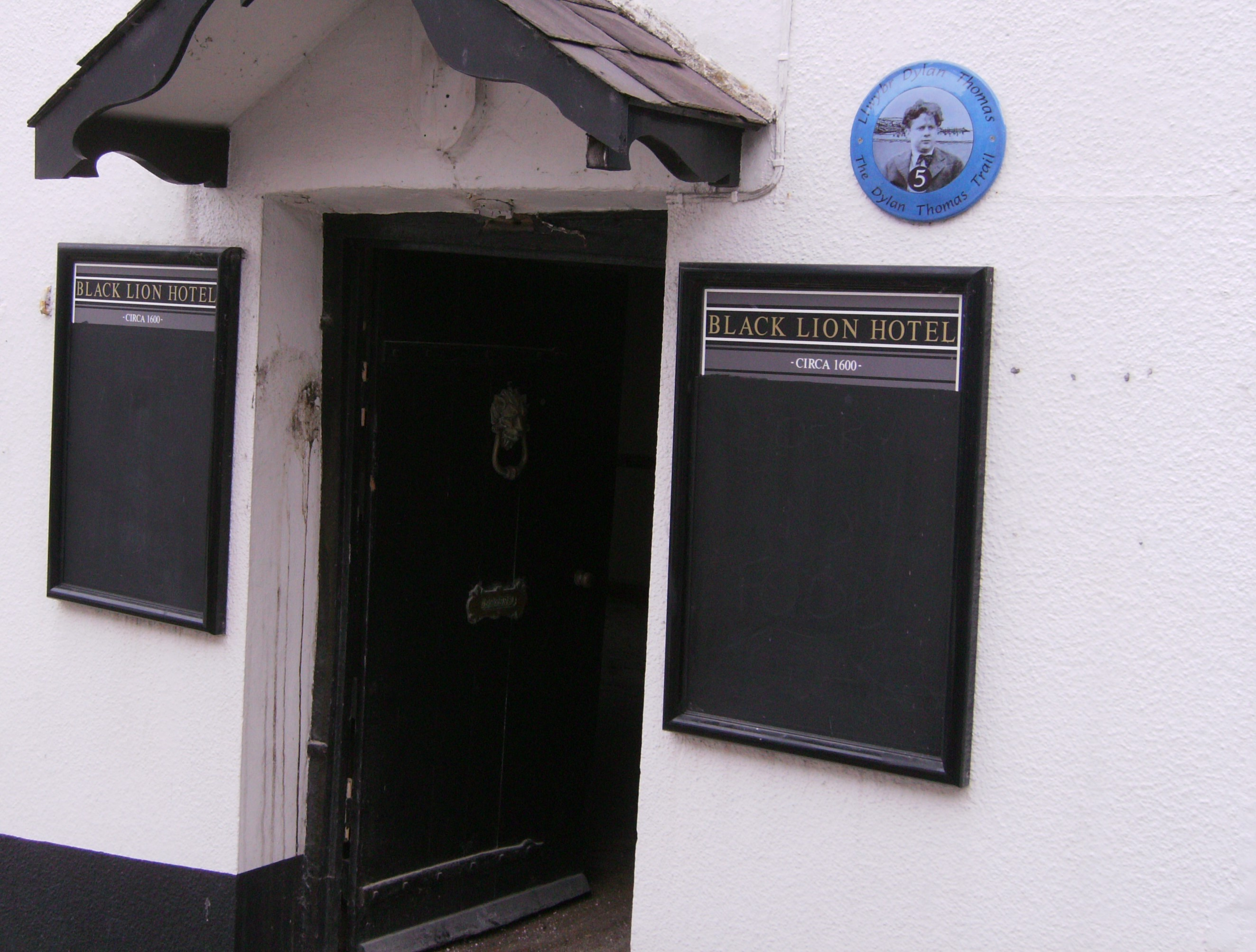
Black Lion Hotel, New Quay, on the Dylan Thomas Trail number 5.

== Llanon to Llanina ==
The Trail begins on the coast at the Central Hotel in Llanon, then meanders through upland countryside to Plas Gelli, Tal-sarn, the mansion where Dylan and Caitlin lived for part of World War II. It then turns west to wander along the beautiful Aeron valley. The walk passes Tyglyn Aeron (now a hotel) which was the summer home of the publisher, Geoffrey Faber, where T. S. Eliot spent his holidays in the 1930s.

The Trail continues past the National Trust's Llanerchaeron estate and then along a disused railway line to Aberaeron, where Dylan had a number of friends, including Thomas Herbert the vet and Dewi Ianthe, the battery man. From here, the Trail follows the cliffs to New Quay, passing close to Plas Llanina, where Dylan, "hoofed with seaweed, did a jig on the Llanina sands and barked at the far mackerel". Under the waves lies a drowned cemetery which has been described as "the literal truth that inspired the imaginative and poetic truth" of Under Milk Wood. Plas Llanina was once the home of Lord Howard de Walden, who encouraged Dylan to write in the apple house in the garden.

== Majoda and New Quay ==
Next comes Majoda, where Dylan and family lived from September 1944 to July 1945. It is a modern bungalow today but when Dylan lived there it was a wood and asbestos shack with no inside facilities. They were there during one of the coldest winters on record. Despite the weather, it was one of the most productive periods of Dylan's life, described as "a second flowering, a period of fertility that recalls the earliest days". His Majoda poems were "among the finest that he wrote...they provided nearly half the poems for Deaths and Entrances". And it was here in Majoda that Dylan started writing Under Milk Wood, as well as the poem Fern Hill.

The Trail then follows the beach, before it arrives in New Quay, its finishing point. There are further day walks on extensions of the Trail, including Eli Jenkins' Pub Walk which follows the River Dewi (the name of the river in Under Milk Wood) to the coast at Cwmtydu. Another walk is the town trail around New Quay, taking in the house where his aunt and cousins lived, as well as Dylan's favourite pub, the Black Lion, where Augustus John used to exhibit. Caitlin preferred the Dolau pub, as did Alastair Graham, who had once been Evelyn Waugh's lover.

A companion book is available for those walking the Trail who want to know more about Dylan's time in west Wales. It contains an account of the shooting incident at Majoda whilst Dylan lived there in 1945. A collection of published articles is also available, as well as a photographic history of New Quay and an account of New Quay's maritime profile as seen through the 1939 War Register.

== And Onwards ==
The coastal stretch of the Trail forms part of the Wales Coast Path and the Ceredigion Coast Path, and is included in a number of the Path's walking guides. Dylan ardents can follow the coast path from New Quay to Llangrannog, where Dylan enjoyed meeting up in the Pentre Arms with World War I, flying ace, Ira Jones. The coast path then continues southwards, passing Yr Hendre farm, near St. Dogmaels, where the sixteen-year old Dylan camped with a school friend in 1930. The holiday is described in the Trail guide.

The Dylan Thomas Trail is established on various walking and cycling websites, and has appeared in tourism guides. It also heads the Wales Online list of 100 things to do in Ceredigion before you die. It has received national media coverage, as well as more academic consideration.
