= Lampeter railway station =

Former railway station in Wales

Coordinates: 52.1156°N 4.0729°W

Lampeter railway station, on the Carmarthen to Aberystwyth Line in Wales, was built to serve the town of Lampeter. It opened in 1866, six years after the line, which reached Aberystwyth in August 1867.

Services at the time were limited, with only three trains running every day except Sundays. However, even this service enabled Lampeter to become an important station, although the cost of building the railway was slowly bankrupting the company. A steam Locomotive, No7 "Carmarthen", exploded at Maesycreigiau in 1890, and the Cambrian Railway took the M&M to court over unpaid bills. The railway was originally owned by the Manchester and Milford Railway Company, but owing to great financial difficulties, it was sold to the Great Western Railway in 1906.

In 1911, a branch line was constructed between Lampeter and Aberaeron, known as the Lampeter, Aberayron and New Quay Light Railway.

During the Second World War, specifically on Saturday 8 July 1944, Lampeter railway station received a contingent of 330 evacuee children from London who were then distributed to homes in and around the local area (including the village of Cribyn). That same day Aberystwyth railway station likewise received 400 evacuee children.

After the nationalisation of the railways, the passenger service to Aberaeron ceased in 1951. Passenger services from Carmarthen ran through to Aberystwyth until flooding severely damaged the line south of Aberystwyth in December 1964. A limited passenger service continued running from Carmarthen to Strata Florida until February 1965. Milk continued to be conveyed by railway until 1973 when the traffic was transferred to the road, and the tracks were lifted shortly afterwards. The former existence of the presence of a railway in Lampeter is still obvious; the large station and goods yard are now part of the University and the Cattle Market. Station Terrace has retained its name, and the railway bridge over the River Teifi near the Co-operative Supermarket still stands. The remains of the platforms still exist on the grounds of the university, heavily overgrown, and are not accessible to the public. A bridge once carried the railway over the A482, but this has since been dismantled, although the trackbed still remains in both directions. Local residents have been campaigning for the return of the railway to Lampeter.

Preceding station	Disused railways	Following station
Pencarreg Halt	Great Western Railway; Carmarthen to Aberystwyth Line	Derry Ormond
Terminus	Great Western Railway; Lampeter, Aberayron and New Quay Light Railway	Silian Halt
