= River Aeron =

River in Ceredigion, Wales

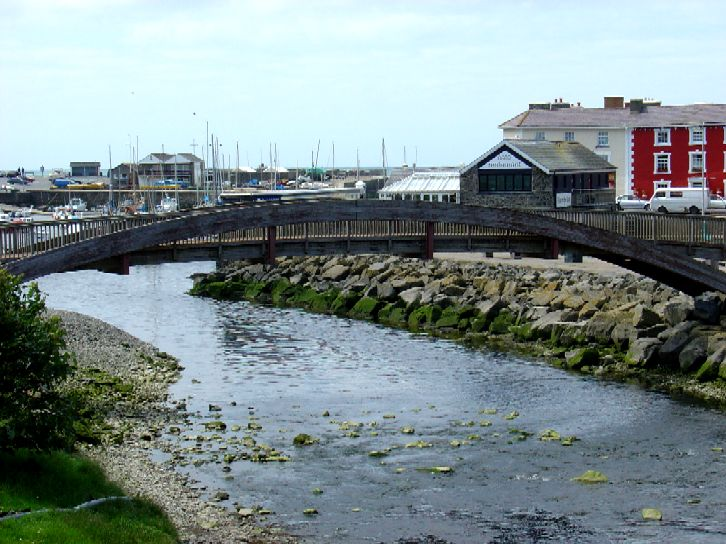
- The Aeron at Aberaeron
- Native name: Afon Aeron (Welsh)

Location
- Country: Wales

Physical characteristics
- Source: Llyn Eiddwen
  - coordinates: 52°16′58.8″N 4°2′38.4″W
- Mouth: Aberaeron
  - coordinates: 52°14′36.52″N 4°15′52.24″W

The River Aeron (Welsh: Afon Aeron) is a small river in Ceredigion, Wales, that flows into Cardigan Bay at Aberaeron. It is also referred to on some older maps as the River Ayron.

== Etymology ==
The name of the river means "battle" or "slaughter" and derives from the Middle Welsh aer with the same meaning. Aeron is believed to have been a Welsh god of war. Past interpretations of the name have included that of William Owen Pughe, who in his Dictionary of the Welsh Language believed Aeron meant "queen of brightness". Aeron can also mean berries, fruit and grain. It is a word that suggests the fruitfulness of the autumn harvest in a valley of plenty.

== Sources and valley ==
The Aeron has its source in Llyn Eiddwen, in the range of hills called Mynydd Bach. It then follows a more or less westerly and then north-westerly track to the sea. It has a rather broad river valley bounded by low hills and has relatively few significant tributaries which include the Gwenffrwd, Nant Wysg, Nant Picadilly, Nant y Wernen and Nant Rhiw Afallan. The Afon Mydr drains an area of old woodlands and dairy farming and includes the old farm of Rhiwbren Fawr.

On its way to the sea, the Aeron passes through the villages of Talsarn, Felinfach, Ystrad Aeron and Ciliau Aeron, where it runs alongside the restored walled garden (now in the care of a local charity) of Ty Glyn Mansion.

A mile or so later, the Aeron then flows close to the restored mansion at Llanerchaeron which is now in the care of the National Trust before entering the town of Aberaeron where it passes into Cardigan Bay. There's a walk following the Aeron that runs along the river bank between Llanerchaeron and Aberaeron.

It’s an indication of the fertility of the Aeron valley that eight mansions were built in the 18th and 19th centuries along the valley between Talsarn and Aberaeron, with two more looking down on the Aeron from above.

Despite the relatively small size of the river, it sustains a population of salmon and brown trout.

Although the Aeron has suffered from intermittent pollution including some severe incidents in the 1970s caused by creamery waste and crude sewage escapes in the Felinfach area, the principal impacts are now diffuse agricultural waste, pesticides from agriculture and acidification especially from upland forestry plantations.

== Literary tradition ==
Dylan Thomas lived near the banks of the river in the 1940s, at a secluded mansion called Plas Gelli, just outside Talsarn. He called the Aeron valley "the most precious place in the world." He also mentions the peacefulness of the Aeron valley in his 1949 radio broadcast, Living in Wales. It’s said that Dylan and his wife, Caitlin, named their daughter, Aeronwy, after the Aeron. The Dylan Thomas Trail follows the river from Talsarn to Aberaeron.

Talsarn and its hinterland was once the centre of a thriving group of country poets (beirdd y wlad ). They included John Davies (1722–1799), John Jenkins (1825–1894) and his brother Joseph Jenkins (1818–1898), Jenkin Jenkins Felincoed (1845–1892), William Lloyd (d.1911, Llundain Fach), Dinah Davies Tynrhos (1851–1931), David Davies (Perthneuadd) and Dan Jenkins Pentrefelin (1856–1946). Joseph Jenkins also wrote for agricultural journals, as well as writing a book on his travels in Australia.

The village of Ystrad Aeron, a few miles along the River Aeron from Talsarn, was the home of the bookbinder and poet, John Davies (Shôn Dafydd y Crydd) 1722–1799. Davies’ diary with poems for 1 January 1796 to 19 December 1799 is in the National Library of Wales. It is available online.

The next village along the Aeron from Ystrad Aeron is Ciliau Aeron, which also has a varied literary tradition. The dockworker-poet James Hughes (Iago Trichrug) 1799-1844 was born here at Neuadd-ddu.

The poet-priest David Davis (Dafis Castellhywel), 1745-1827 had his first ministry in the village's Unitarian chapel.

The Dylan Thomas Trail runs through Ciliau Aeron, passing the Ty Glyn Aeron hotel, which had once been the home from the early 1900s of the poet and writer, Evelyn Anna Lewes (1873–1961). One of her books was A Guide to Aberaeron and the Aeron Valley (1922). She is entered in the Dictionary of Welsh Biography. The publisher, Geoffrey Faber, bought the mansion in 1930 and T. S. Eliot took his holidays there throughout the 1930s.

The poet, Stevie Krayer, who lived in Ciliau Aeron for over twenty years, has written a sequence of poems about the Aeron.
