= Lampeter, Aberayron and New Quay Light Railway =

Former railway in south-west Wales

The Lampeter, Aberayron and New Quay Light Railway was an independent branch line railway in south west Wales. It connected Aberayron (later spelt Aberaeron) to the former Manchester and Milford Railway line at Lampeter; New Quay was never reached.

It opened in 1911 and was loss-making from the outset; it was worked, and to some extent funded, by the Great Western Railway, and absorbed by that company in 1922. The limited passenger train service was discontinued in 1951, but at the same time a new creamery was opened at Green Grove on the line near Felin Fach, bringing significant milk traffic to the line.

The remaining general goods traffic ceased in 1965 and the milk traffic finished in 1973, when the line closed completely.

== First railways ==
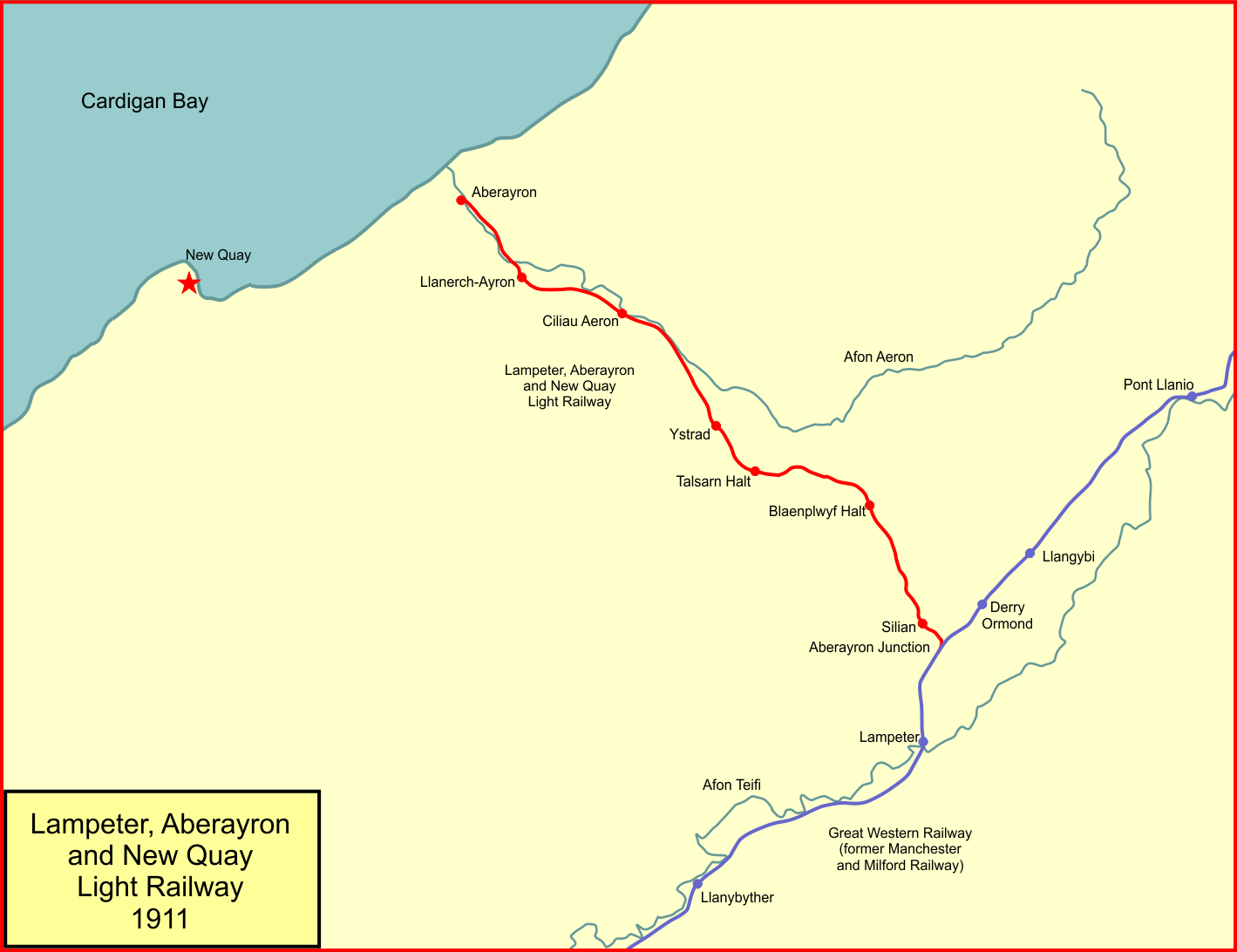
The Lampeter, Aberayron and New Quay Light Railway in 1911

In the eighteenth century, most of Aberayron's trade had been conducted by sea; the road network was of poor quality and inadequate. The main materials of trade were slate, limestone, coal and grain; the hinterland was solely agricultural.

The nearest town of any size was Lampeter, 13 miles away, with a population of 2,000. As the railway network in the region began to develop, thoughts turned to connecting Aberayron to a railway branch line. At first there was the Carmarthen and Cardigan Railway, which was planned to reach Cardigan by way of Newcastle Emlyn. It opened the first short section of its line in 1860 and reached Llandyssil, in 1864. Always desperately short of money, the C&CR never managed to extend beyond that point, although the Great Western Railway later took the company over and extended the line to Newcastle Emlyn.

The Manchester and Milford Railway (M&MR) promoted its line, obtaining an authorising act of Parliament, the Manchester and Milford Railway Act 1860 (23 & 24 Vict. c. clxxv). It did not aspire to build a line either to Manchester or to Milford Haven, but to form the central link in a chain of lines through mid Wales, connecting with other companies at each end. During the construction phase it became obvious that the company's limited financial resources would not permit the intended north-eastward line to Llanidloes, where it had planned to connect with routes northward. A change of route was authorised, and the onward construction was diverted to Aberystwyth instead. That town was already served by the Cambrian Railways.

The M&MR was opened throughout from Pencader to Aberystwyth on 12 August 1867; at Pencader it connected with the Carmarthen and Cardigan Railway. With debt on interest mounting up, the M&MR leased its line for 999 years to the Great Western Railway in 1905 and sold the company to the GWR in 1911.

Also in 1860, David Davies proposed a line from Pencader (where the Manchester and Milford and the Carmarthen and Cardigan lines joined one another) to Aberayron by way of Lampeter, but nothing came of this scheme.

In 1885 a further scheme was put forward, this time for a narrow gauge line from Llandyssil to New Quay; J W Szlumper, engineer to the Pembroke and Tenby Railway, conducted a survey, but this too came to nothing.

== Vale of Rheidol ==
On 6 August 1897 the Vale of Rheidol Light Railway obtained the Vale of Rheidol (Light) Railway Act 1897 (60 & 61 Vict. c. clxxiv) authorising it to build a line from Devil's Bridge to Aberystwyth. The 12 mile line was to be built to a gauge of 1 ft 11 1/2in. (Note: This is the gauge usually quoted; Price says 1ft 11 5/8in on page 71, and some sources refer to it as "the two-feet gauge".) Although tourism was beginning to be a commercial factor, this was no tourist line, and its primary purpose was to convey lead ore and timber from the hinterland at Devil's Bridge to the coast for onward transport. The authorised capital was £68,000.

At the time of authorisation, the VoR directors were talking of an extension from Aberystwyth to Aberayron along the coast, a distance of 16 miles. This was no idle thinking, for on 13 August 1898 the directors of the Vale of Rheidol obtained a light railway order for the extension, the Vale of Rheidol Light Railway (Aberayron Extension) Order 1898. The Vale of Rheidol was authorised to raise another £25,000 in shares to finance the extension. However raising the capital proved to be impossible, and nothing could be done towards the extension, even though Cardiganshire County Council, anxious to develop the area, had offered an £18,000 grant. The powers for the Aberayron extension were extinguished in 1904.

The Great Western Railway leased the Manchester and Milford Railway from 1 July 1906, and a local newspaper reported: "We expect great things from the Great Western, and also want some of their splendid motor buses to connect Aberayron and New Quay with the railway."

== A light railway from Lampeter ==
In fact a railway branch line from Lampeter to Aberayron had been proposed by local people in 1903, and an arrangement with the Manchester and Milford Railway for the junction was concluded by early 1904. The concern was to be called the Lampeter, Aberayron and New Quay Light Railway; estimated cost of construction was £88,000, with rolling stock calculated to cost £10,000. At this stage the line was simply to run from Lampeter to Aberayron, and at first the line was to have its own independent station at Lampeter. The M&MR agreed to work the line at cost plus 25% of the profits. The LA&NQLR tried unsuccessfully to get the M&MR to guarantee minimum profit levels.

== Unbuilt route to New Quay ==
By mid-1904 the means of incorporating New Quay into the line was under consideration; the branch would have diverged near the site of the later Crossways Halt at the modern hamlet of Neuaddlwyd adjacent to the A482 main road. It would have turned through 90 degrees to climb southwards via Oakford, then turning southwest to enter the village of Llanarth. a station in the middle of the village was planned followed by a short tunnel to emerge between the present-day Llanina Arms pub and garden centre.

The line would then descend past Wern mansion, via Gilfachreda to New Quay. This proposed route was used as the alignment in the late 1920s for a new main road from Llanarth to New Quay (the present day B4343). This road built has embankments, retaining walls, gentle curves and gradual gradients which are all railway-like in their construction.

The route was planned to enter New Quay along New Road before following the present-day School Lane, crossing behind the rear of the primary school to Francis Street and New Quay Bowls Club to terminate at the public library and car park area at the top of the town. Also proposed was a steeply graded branch to the harbour running from the junction of School Lane and New Road to descend behind George Street and above the lifeboat station to reach the harbour area.

It was to be a branch of the Aberayron line, diverging about 2 miles inland from Aberayron, and with significant gradients planned it would have consequently high operating costs. This was discussed with the county council, in the interests of securing a grant from them; the 7 1/4 mile New Quay branch added £63,000 to the cost estimates. At this stage the receipts from the entire network were estimated to be £10 per mile per week.

== Light railway order granted ==
On 1 October 1906 the Great Western Railway inaugurated the sought-for motor omnibus service between Lampeter and Aberayron, and on 9 October 1906 the Lampeter, Aberayron, and New Quay Light Railway Order 1906 authorising the Lampeter, Aberayron and New Quay Light Railway was granted. At last progress could be made and the first sod was cut on 20 October 1906. The New Quay branch was quietly dropped from the proposed construction, although the County Council had earlier considered this to be an essential part of the work so far as their grant was concerned.

The contractor appointed was Edmund Nuttall, but subscription money came in very slowly indeed and it was not possible to carry out any construction. This situation was worsened when the GWR, who had been asked to work the line when it was completed, asked for considerable additional works to make the line to the standard they would require. The GWR insisted on some of the sharpest curves being eased before they took on the working.

Time went by with limited progress, but a Treasury grant of £10,000 was made in April 1910, and the GWR was persuaded to fund the final stages of construction itself. The line was considered to be ready for opening between the junction near Lampeter and Ystrad in June 1910, but before arrangements were made for the Board of Trade inspection, the Great Western Railway asserted their position that the line was not satisfactory from their point of view, and they insisted on delaying opening until the whole line was ready. This dragged into the following year, and the GWR took possession of the line on 3 April 1911 and opened it to goods traffic on 10 April 1911.

== Opening ==
Lieutenant Colonel Druitt of the Board of Trade inspected the line on 10 May 1911 and found it to be satisfactory and the line was opened to passenger traffic on 12 May 1911. The line was worked from the outset by the Great Western Railway, although for a short period the main line at Lampeter was still in the hands of the M&MR; absorption of that company by the GWR was now all but finalised. No expansion of the station accommodation at Lampeter was considered necessary to handle the branch traffic. The point of junction from the M&MR main line was at Aberayron Junction, about 1 1/2 miles north of Lampeter station. The ruling gradient was 1 in 41 and there was a passing place on the single line at Ystrad (later Felin Fach).

The profit made by the line was insignificant, and was in fact insufficient to pay the interest due to the GWR and the banks, and the Directors paid with their own money. In fact the company made a loss of £962 in 1912 and made a loss in every year of its independent existence.

The charges made by the GWR were evidently a running sore; in February 1914 it was reported:

The directors state that during the year the negotiations with the Great Western Railway have been continued, and several matters in dispute have been settled. The construction charge [actually the GWR loan to complete the line] has been settled at £5,128... the charge of £1,459 7s 4d for the first year's maintenance has been withdrawn. So far the directors have been unable to get the Great Western to reduce their minimum charge of £3,000 per annum for working the line, though the auto-car service cost less than the train service contemplated in the working agreement. The company... will receive £436 18s 6d as surplus on this year's working, after deducting income-tax... The gross receipts for the year amounted to £3,464 19s 9d as compared with £2,998 18s 2d in 1912.

== After 1922 ==
The Railways Act 1921 was a measure by which the Government required all the main line railways of Great Britain to be "grouped" into four large companies; in this are the Great Western Railway formed one of the groups. The Lampeter, Aberayron and New Quay Light Railway was required to be absorbed by the GWR, and as the ordinary shareholders had never received a dividend they did not expect anything from the process. Debenture holders received a swap for GWR debenture stock in the ratio 1:3. The administrative process of the grouping was complete and on 1 July 1922 the loss-making company's line and assets were taken over by the GWR.

After World War I road transport competition had begun to take effect and in the latter half of the 1920s this competition became significant. From a very low base, the GWR tried to encourage traffic in the thinly populated area; the opening of a new halt at Crossways in April 1929 to encourage traffic can hardly have done much to affect the losses.

The weekday passenger train service had long been four trains each way, although this was reduced to three during World War II.

Nationalisation of the railways took place in 1948; there were four daily passenger trains once again, but inevitably the new owner, British Railways, considered the carryings on the line. A survey showed that 7,000 passengers were carried in the whole of 1950, an average of six per train. This led to definite proposals to close the line. When the coal emergency (Note: After 1945 there was an extreme shortage of coal, at that time an essential source of power for industry.) became serious, the Railways' managements were asked to take exceptional measures to reduce coal consumption, and it was decided to suspend passenger train services on the line; this was done from the last train on 10 February 1951. Although ostensibly a temporary measure, the trains were not restored and the formal closure to passengers took place on 7 May 1951.

== Green Grove Creamery ==
In 1951 a new creamery was opened at Green Grove, near Felin Fach, by the Milk Marketing Board. It started operation on 10 May 1951 as a single siding and as well as processing milk it served as a concentration point for conveyance of liquid milk to London and other large population centres. Milk trains ran seven days a week to Lampeter, the milk continuing from there to Carmarthen attached to passenger trains from Aberystwyth before attaching to other milk trains from other locations in West Wales (such as from Whitland and Carmarthen creameries).

After closure of the line to passengers in 1951 and later freight in 1963, Green Grove siding continued to be used with the track lifted beyond this to Aberayron. Milk traffic continued with diesel-hydraulic Class 35 locomotives taking over, followed by Class 37s before final closure in 1973. Several railtours composed of DMUs ran to Green Grove, although by this time the branch was significantly overgrown with vegetation, making traction in parts difficult.

== Closure ==
The general goods traffic had also declined steeply, and after 5 April 1965 goods traffic on the line was discontinued; the branch was shortened back to Green Grove; from that time the milk tanker traffic was the only traffic using the line. It too ceased on 1 October 1973 and from that time the line was completely closed.

== Topography ==
- Aberayron; opened 12 May 1911; closed 12 February 1951;
- Llanerch Ayron Halt; opened 2 October 1911; closed 12 February 1951;
- Crossways Halt; opened 8 April 1929; closed 12 February 1951;
- Ciliau Aeron; opened 12 May 1911; closed 12 February 1951;
- Felin Fach -- Green Grove Siding; closed 1 October 1973;
- Ystrad Aeron; opened 12 May 1911; renamed Felin Fach; closed 12 February 1951;
- Talsarn Halt; opened 12 May 1911; closed 12 February 1915;
- Blaenplwf Halt; opened 12 May 1911; closed 12 February 1951;
- Silian Halt; opened 2 May 1911; closed 12 February 1951;
- Aberayron Junction; convergence with Manchester and Milford Railway main line;
- Lampeter; M&MR station; opened 1 January 1866; closed 22 February 1965.

== Route ==
The first halt, Silian Halt, was located half a mile from Aberaeron Junction at the road crossing of the Lampeter-to-Tregaron road (now the A485). The line then climbed north westwards out of the valley of the River Dulas (a tributary of the River Teifi) towards Felinfach for several miles to the summit of the line near Blaenplwyf farm. The line then descended by clinging to the side of a narrow valley to cross the Lampeter-to-Talsarn road (now the B4337) where a halt was located. It then descended further into the valley of the River Aeron to enter the only principal station and intermediate passing loop on the line at Felinfach. Beyond here the line stayed in the base of the valley on generally level ground, passing the milk creamery at Green Grove and continuing to the halt at Ciliau Aeron. Beyond here the line traversed the country estate of Llanerchaeron, and several halts were provided for workers to travel to the entrance roads to the estate. The first halt was 2 miles west of Ciliau Aeron at Crossways Halt. Then the line traversed some cuttings and embankments to ensure it was not visible from the mansion of the Llanerchaeron estate, before arriving at the Llanerchaeron Halt. Beyond here, the line followed the now much narrower valley of the River Aeron, and after a level crossing, crossed the river on a two-arched bridge for the remainder of the line into Aberayron.

The engine shed and goods yard were located on the outskirts of the town on the north side of the River Aeron. A GWR 'camping coach' was also located here later in the branch's life. Beyond here was a substantial double-track river bridge: the most significant structure on the whole line and obviously intended to provide access to the south side of the River Aeron to continue the route to Aberaeron Harbour. Beyond this bridge was a single platform and station building on the north side of the track that was joined later in the branch's life by three GWR prefabricated concrete storage sheds.

== Remains of the route ==
Many sections of the branch line’s trackbed is still in existence, although some have been taken over and returned to fields and landscaped over.

The trackbed diverging from the Manchester & Milford route at Aberayron Junction can still easily be seen. A short distance northwards is the remains of a brick platform for Silian Halt visible adjacent to a former level crossing of the A485 road at Glan Denys. North of the A485, the trackbed has been removed and incorporated into fields. From an unclassified road northeast of the village of Creuddyn Bridge was located Blaenplwyf Halt. From here the trackbed can be followed to Talsarn Halt and Felinfach.

Sections of trackbed in beyond Felinfach have been built on as housing developments or ploughed into fields with very few remains visible. The station site at Felinfach is now an extended parking area for the adjacent garage and petrol station. Green Grove siding is inaccessible within the factory area, but is still a defined gap between the original factory building and a newer extension that has been since closure of the line.

A section of trackbed on a low embankment between Felinfach and Ciliau Aeron is now used as an access road to fishing lakes that have been created either side of the trackbed. The former Ciliau Aeron station building still exists and can be seen from the adjacent mjnor road. A housing development sits on the trackbed beyond in tve village, before re-appearing at the rear of a farm near to Crossways Halt. A further section of trackbed between Crossways Halt and Llanerchaeron Halt remains partially open as a footpath.

The section of trackbed beyond Llanerchaeron Halt to the entrance to the former Aberayron goods yard and engine shed is a well used popular cycle path linking the town of Aberaeron with the National Trust property at Llanerchaeron.

The former Aberayron engine shed area is now a housing development, whilst the goods yard area is occupied by a Jewson builder's hardware yard. Access to this yard is unusual in that it uses the still-intact double-track iron railway bridge over the River Aeron which has been paved. The site of the station platform is adjacent to this bridge and it can be seen that the paved road climbs up to the level of the former platform and descends to track level to cross the river bridge - this change in level of the paved road was kept to assist in flood mitigation. The site of the Aberayron station building is now occupied by an office building. This was built by the Welsh Water Authority in the 1970s. The office building was extended to its rear during 2003, several GWR prefabricated concrete sheds and brick platform loading dock had still been in existence until that time.

Because the line ran in the base of both the River Dulas and the River Aeron valleys, there were very few bridges, but those that do still exist are concrete bridges located east under an unclassified dead-end road from Talsarn Halt, and west from Talsarn Halt - across a small stream (visible from the A482 road) located a quarter-mile east of Felinfach Primary School. There is also a bridge located between Crossways Halt and Llanerchaeron Halt (visible from the A482 road) where the road and trackbed are located together and cross the River Mydyr.

Most of the platforms at the halts on the line were constructed of wooden rail sleepers and have not survived, being either dismantled at closure, subsequently removed by farmers or simply rotted away; but brick platforms at Silian halt are still visible from the A485 road. The brick platform, heavily overgrown, and a replica GWR Pagoda-style waiting room at Llanerch-Ayron Halt railway station with station sign was built in 2011. It is accessible easily by following the footpath from the North off the minor road leading to the Llanerchaeron estate. Others at Talsarn Halt railway station are visible from the B4337 road as well as Blaenplwyf Halt railway station which is visible from a minor road although is significantly overgrown.

The Felinfach station building was removed for development of a garage and motor dealership but was dismantled, re-erected and restored on the Gwili Railway, at Llwyfan Cerrig station, by volunteer rail enthusiasts.

== Proposed railway to Aberaeron harbour ==
A substantial double-track river bridge was constructed, apparently intended to provide access to the south side of the River Aeron to continue the route to Aberaeron Harbour. This route would have crossed the Aberaeron-to-Lampeter (now A482) road and would have continued along the south side of the River Aeron along what is now a riverside walk. It would then have crossed the Cardigan-to-Aberystwyth main coast road (now the A487) and entered the harbour on the south side. The line was never built, owing to strong opposition from the harbour company and from sea captains who owned and operated boats from the harbour.
