= *Agronā =

Hypothetical name for the River Ayr

*Agronā was a hypothetical reconstructed Proto-Celtic name for the River Ayr in Scotland, later applied to the River Aeron in Wales. The claim is linguistic and first appeared in William J. Watson's Celtic Placenames of Scotland (1926). Watson suggested the River Ayr in Scotland could be worked back to a hypothetical Proto-Celtic "river goddess of slaughter and carnage" and that the deity name was *Agronā. At that time there were many questionable Scottish nationalist attempts to use the River Ayr place-name to claim Taliesin's battle poems for Scotland and Watson's derivation strongly and implicitly supported such claims. This hypothesis has also been used to support locating the ancient kingdom of Aeron in modern-day Ayrshire.

Two years after Watson, Eilert Ekwall in his English River-Names (1928) instead derived the River Ayr simply from the root *Ara (but see his discussion of the Aeron under the entry for the Yorkshire River Aire). However, the earlier claim that the river's name literally means "carnage" persisted. The derivation from "carnage" has become casually conflated with the similarly named Welsh river Aeron. Pughe's 1803 Dictionary of the Welsh Language states that the Aeron name for rivers in living Welsh meant "Queen of Brightness".

== Bibliography ==
- Berresford Ellis, Peter. Dictionary of Celtic Mythology (Oxford Paperback Reference), Oxford University Press (1994). ISBN 0-19-508961-8
- MacKillop, James. Dictionary of Celtic Mythology. Oxford University Press (1998). ISBN 0-19-280120-1.
- Wood, Juliette, The Celts: Life, Myth, and Art, Thorsons Publishers (2002). ISBN 0-00-764059-5
