= Aberaeron =

Town in Ceredigion, Wales

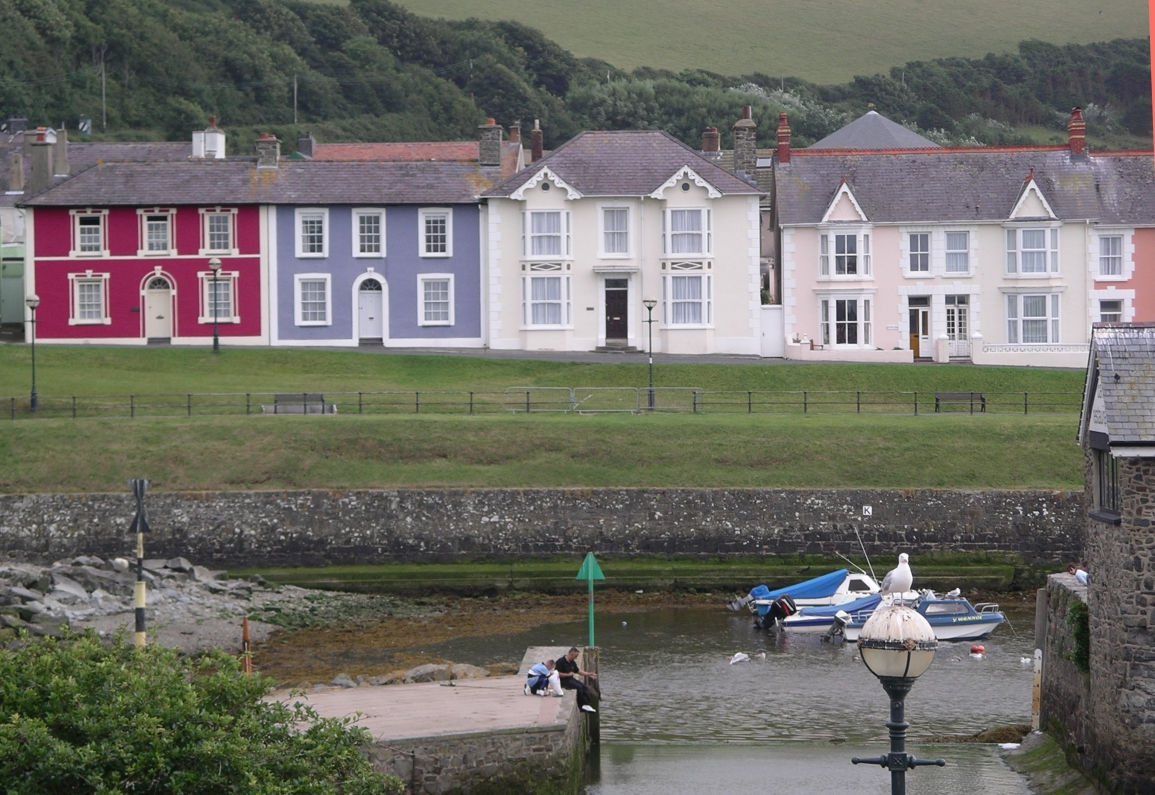
- Houses on the quay

- Location within Ceredigion
- Population: 1,422
- OS grid reference: SN458628
- Principal area: Ceredigion
- Preserved county: Dyfed
- Country: Wales
- Sovereign state: United Kingdom
- Post town: ABERAERON
- Postcode district: SA46
- Dialling code: 01545
- Police: Dyfed-Powys
- Fire: Mid and West Wales
- Ambulance: Welsh
- UK Parliament: Ceredigion Preseli
- Senedd Cymru – Welsh Parliament: Ceredigion Penfro
- List of places UK Wales Ceredigion 52.24204°N 4.25921°W Community map: Map of the community

Aberaeron (Welsh pronunciation: [abɛˈrei̯rɔn]), previously anglicised as Aberayron, is a seaside town and community in Ceredigion, Wales. Located on the coast between Aberystwyth and Cardigan, its resident population was 1,274 in the 2021 census.

The name of the town is Welsh for "mouth of the Aeron". It is derived from the Middle Welsh aer (slaughter), which gave its name to Aeron, believed by some to have been a Welsh god of war.

One of the main Ceredigion County Council office sites is located in Aberaeron.

== History and design ==
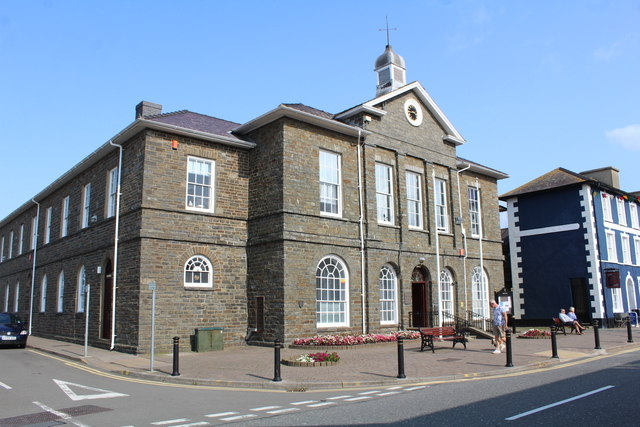
County Hall, Aberaeron (known as Aberaeron Town hall until 1910)

In 1800, there was no significant coastal settlement here. The present town was planned and developed from 1805 by the Rev. Alban Thomas Jones Gwynne. He built a harbour which operated as a port and supported a shipbuilding industry in the 19th century. A group of workmen's houses and a school were built on the harbour's north side, but these were reclaimed by the sea. Steam ships continued to visit the harbour until the 1920s but, in later years, it evolved into a small half-tide harbour for recreational craft. The estuary is also crossed by a wooden pedestrian bridge.

Crafts were an important part of village life in the 19th century. Information recorded in trade directories shows that in 1830, although it was not yet fully developed as a port, in Aberaeron there were one woollen manufacturer, one bootmaker, one baker, one corn miller, one blacksmith, one blacksmith and shovel maker, two shipwrights, one carpenter and one hatmaker.

In the late 1890s, a hand-powered cable car, the Aeron Express, was built to ferry workers across the harbour when the bridge was demolished by floods. The structure was recreated in 1988 as a tourist attraction that ran until the end of summer 1994, when it was closed under health and safety regulations.

The architecture of Aberaeron is unusual for this part of rural Wales, being constructed around a principal square, Alban Square, of Regency style buildings grouped around the harbour. This was the work of Edward Haycock Sr., an architect from Shrewsbury. His designs also included the former Aberaeron Town Hall, which was completed in 1846 and became County Hall, Aberaeron in 1910. Some of the architecture was of sufficient interest to feature on British postage stamps.

Aberaeron Golf Club was founded in 1923. It continued until the Second World War, when the course was turned over to agriculture to aid the war effort. Post-war attempts to reinstate the club failed.

== Castell Cadwgan ==
Castell Cadwgan, a 12th-century ringwork fortification around a probable wooden structure, was by the shore at Aberaeron, but has long since been claimed by the sea. Traces of the structure remain in mounds of earth and the remains of the enclosure bank.

Henry Gastineau's Wales Illustrated in a Series of Views (1810) mentions the site: "Near the town are some remains of an ancient fortress called Castell Cadwgan, thought to have been erected by King Cadwgan, about the year 1148." However, Cadwgan is recorded as having been killed in 1111. Welsh Minstrelsy: Containing the Land beneath the Sea (1824) says: "Just where Sarn Ddewi juts out from the shore is an old fort, called Castell Cadwgan."

== Governance ==
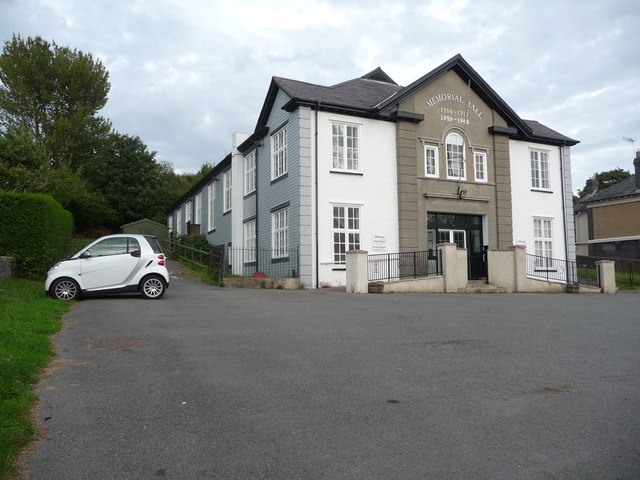
Memorial Hall, South Road

There are two tiers of local government covering Aberaeron, at community (town) and county level: Aberaeron Town Council and Ceredigion County Council. The town council meets at the Memorial Hall on South Road. The county council also has one of its main offices in the town, at Neuadd Cyngor Ceredigion (Ceredigion Council Hall) at Penmorfa.

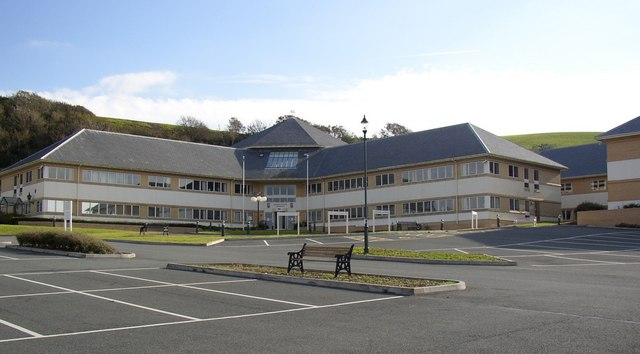
Ceredigion County Council offices at Penmorfa, Aberaeron

=== Administrative history ===
When the town was laid out in the 19th century, Aberaeron straddled the parishes of Henfynyw and Llanddewi Aberarth. Efforts to secure local government functions for the town were hesitant. The town was declared a local government district in 1892, but no-one stood for election to the local board that was supposed to administer the district. The local board remained dormant until local government districts across the country were converted into urban districts under the Local Government Act 1894. Aberayron Urban District Council held its first meeting on 31 December 1894.

The official spelling of the urban district's name was 'Aberayron' until 1966, when the council changed it to 'Aberaeron' to better respect modern Welsh orthography.

Aberaeron Urban District was abolished in 1974 under the Local Government Act 1972. A community called Aberaeron was created instead, covering the area of the abolished urban district. District-level functions passed to Ceredigion District Council, which was in turn replaced in 1996 by Ceredigion County Council.

The first representative for Aberayron on Cardiganshire County Council was John Morgan Howell, who became a prominent figure in the political life of the county. Following his election in January 1889, bonfires were lit to celebrate his victory.

Since 1995, the town has been part of the Aberaeron and Aberarth ward, electing one councillor to Ceredigion County Council. Since 2008, the ward has been represented by Elizabeth Evans for the Welsh Liberal Democrats.

== Education ==
The town and surrounding areas are served by Ysgol Gyfun Aberaeron, a bilingual secondary comprehensive school. Although there is no provision for higher education in the town, three university towns are within easy travelling range: Aberystwyth (13 mi (21 km) away), and the Lampeter (16 mi (26 km)) and Carmarthen (33 mi (53 km)) sites of the University of Wales Trinity Saint David.

== Location and features ==
Aberaeron is located between Cardigan and Aberystwyth on the A487, at a junction with the A482 leading south-east to the university town of Lampeter. It lies on the Ceredigion Coast Path, part of the Wales Coast Path.

The shoreline consists of generally steep storm beaches of pebbles, although fine sand is visible at low tide levels. Aberaeron South Beach was awarded the Blue Flag rural beach award in 2005. The Harbourmaster Hotel is nearby.

The climate is mild and temperate, largely conditioned by the proximity of the relatively shallow sea. However, Aberaeron experiences occasional winter frosts when cold air descends the Aeron valley from the upland parts of Ceredigion.

Dylan Thomas's links with Aberaeron, New Quay and Talsarn have been documented. The Dylan Thomas Trail runs through Ceredigion, passing through Aberaeron and ending in New Quay.

There are 248 listed buildings in the Aberaeron community, most in the town itself.

An annual festival of Welsh ponies and cobs is held on Alban Square Field every August. A life-sized statue of a Welsh cob stallion, sculpted by David Mayer, was donated to the town in 2005 by the festival. An annual carnival takes place on the Monday bank holiday in August, with a procession of floats and a carnival queen moving from the quay to Alban Square. The town also hosts the Aberaeron Mackerel Festival at the end of each fishing season, described by BBC News as a "a light-hearted funeral" for the locally-caught fish. In 2026, People for the Ethical Treatment of Animals suggested replacing the festival with a "cabbage fiesta" in the interests of animal welfare.

== Transport ==
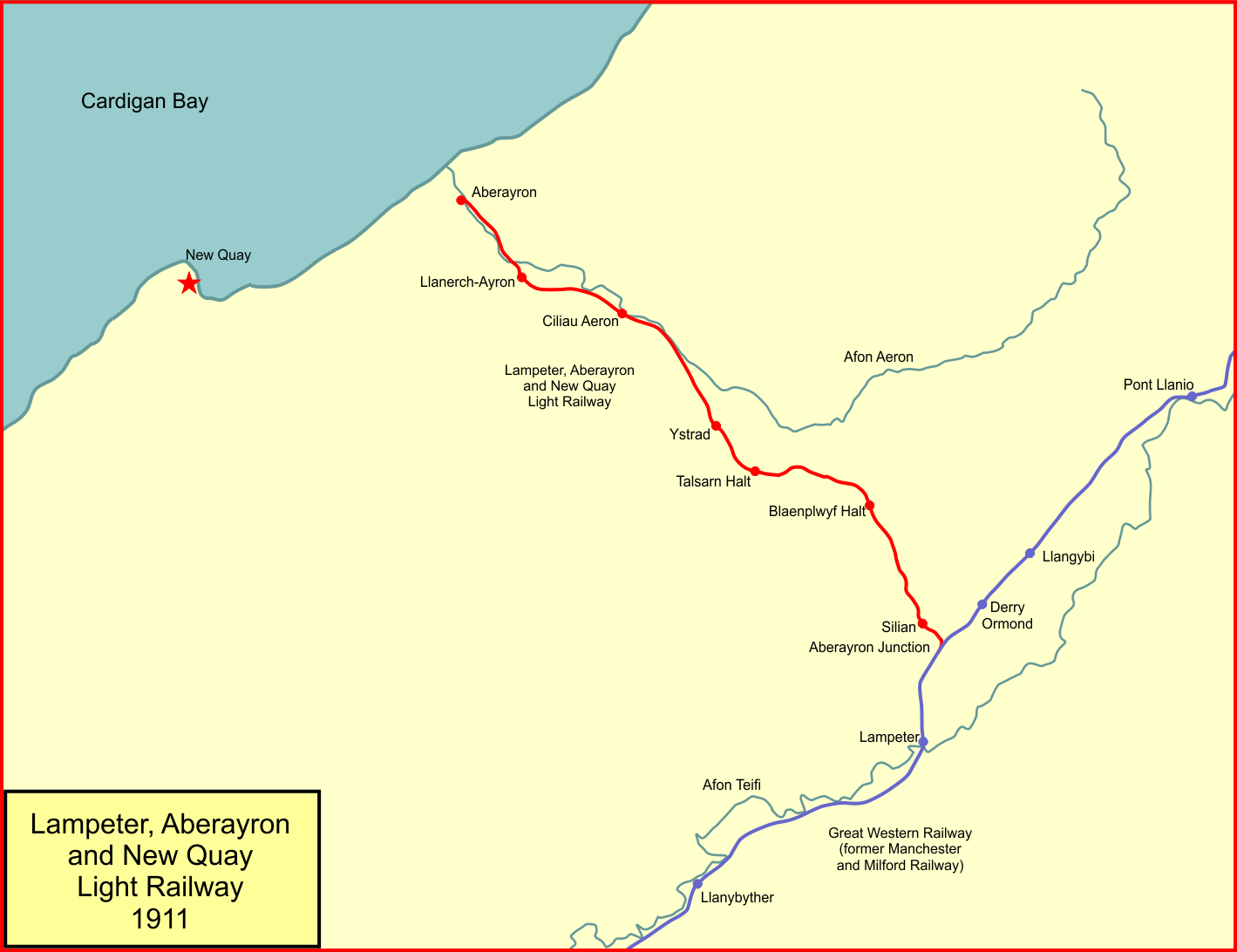
In 1911, a branch line opened to Aberaeron

In 1866, transport in Lampeter was greatly improved with the opening of the railway linking Carmarthen and Aberystwyth. In 1911, a branch line, the Lampeter, Aberayron and New Quay Light Railway, opened to Aberaeron. Following the nationalisation of the railways, the passenger service to Aberaeron ceased in 1951; the last freight train left the town on 2 April 1965.

A regular bus service links the town with Aberystwyth, Lampeter and Carmarthen, with several daily through services to Swansea, Bridgend and Cardiff. Another service connects with New Quay, Aberporth and Cardigan from Monday to Saturday.

== Notable people ==
See Category:People from Aberaeron

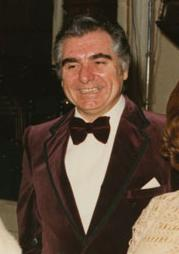
Geraint Evans, 1974

- Jenkin Alban Davies (1885–1976), international rugby union player and chaplain with the Royal Field Artillery in WWI
- Ron Davies (1921–2013), photographer
- Sir Geraint Evans (1922–1992), opera singer, had a home in Aberaeron for more than 30 years
- David Lewis Jones (1945–2010), historian and librarian of the House of Lords Library, 1991 to 2006
- Dic Edwards, (born 1952) playwright & novelist resident from 1997
- Eleri Siôn (born 1971), BBC Radio Wales presenter
- Seirian Sumner (born 1974), entomologist and behavioural ecologist, professor at University College London
- Cynan Jones (born 1975), Welsh writer who lives and works in Ceredigion
- Caryl Lewis (born 1978), Welsh novelist.
- Joshua Tarling (born 2004), Welsh track and road cyclist.

== See also ==
- Aberaeron Broth
- Aberaeron Urban District

== Gallery ==
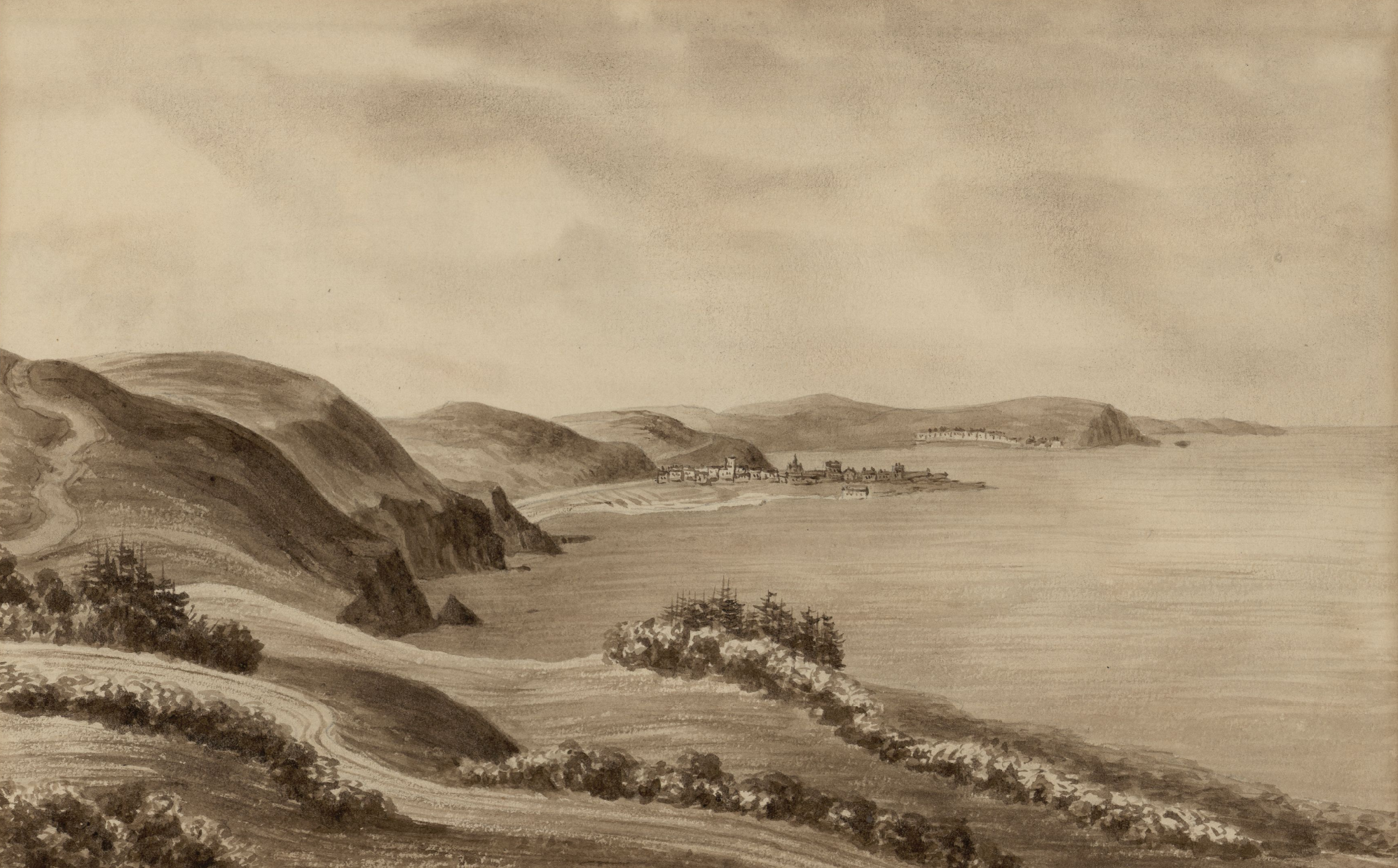
Early 19th-century sketch of Aberaeron

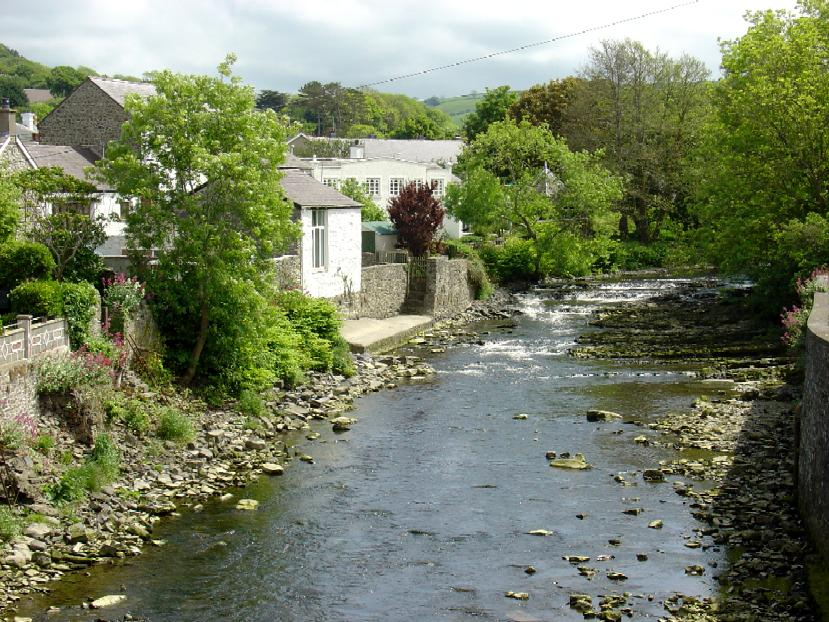
River Aeron

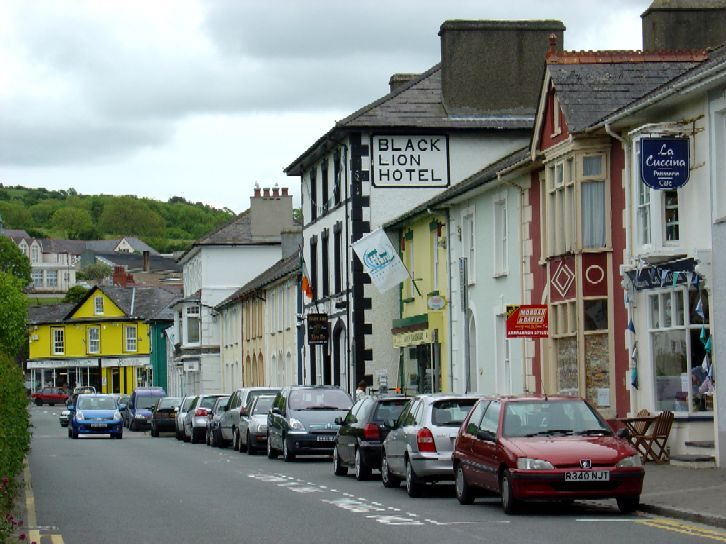
Black Lion Hotel on Alban Square

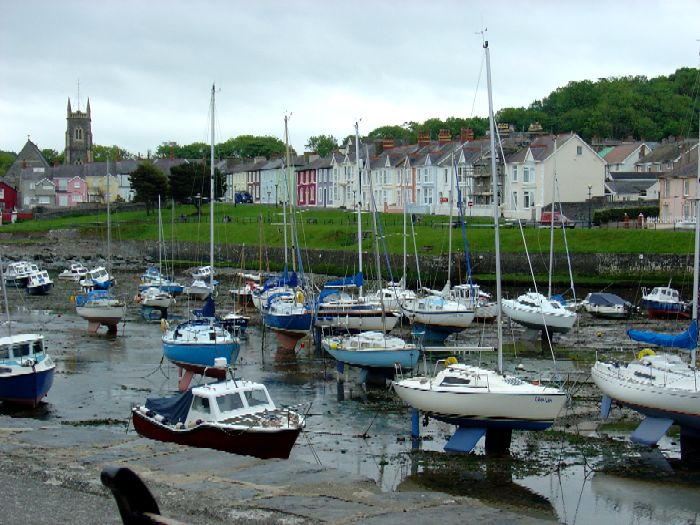
Harbour at low tide

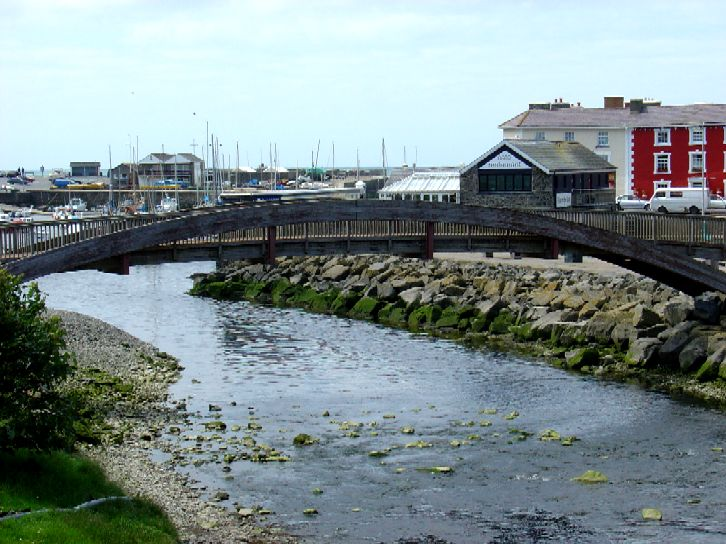
Footbridge over the Aeron

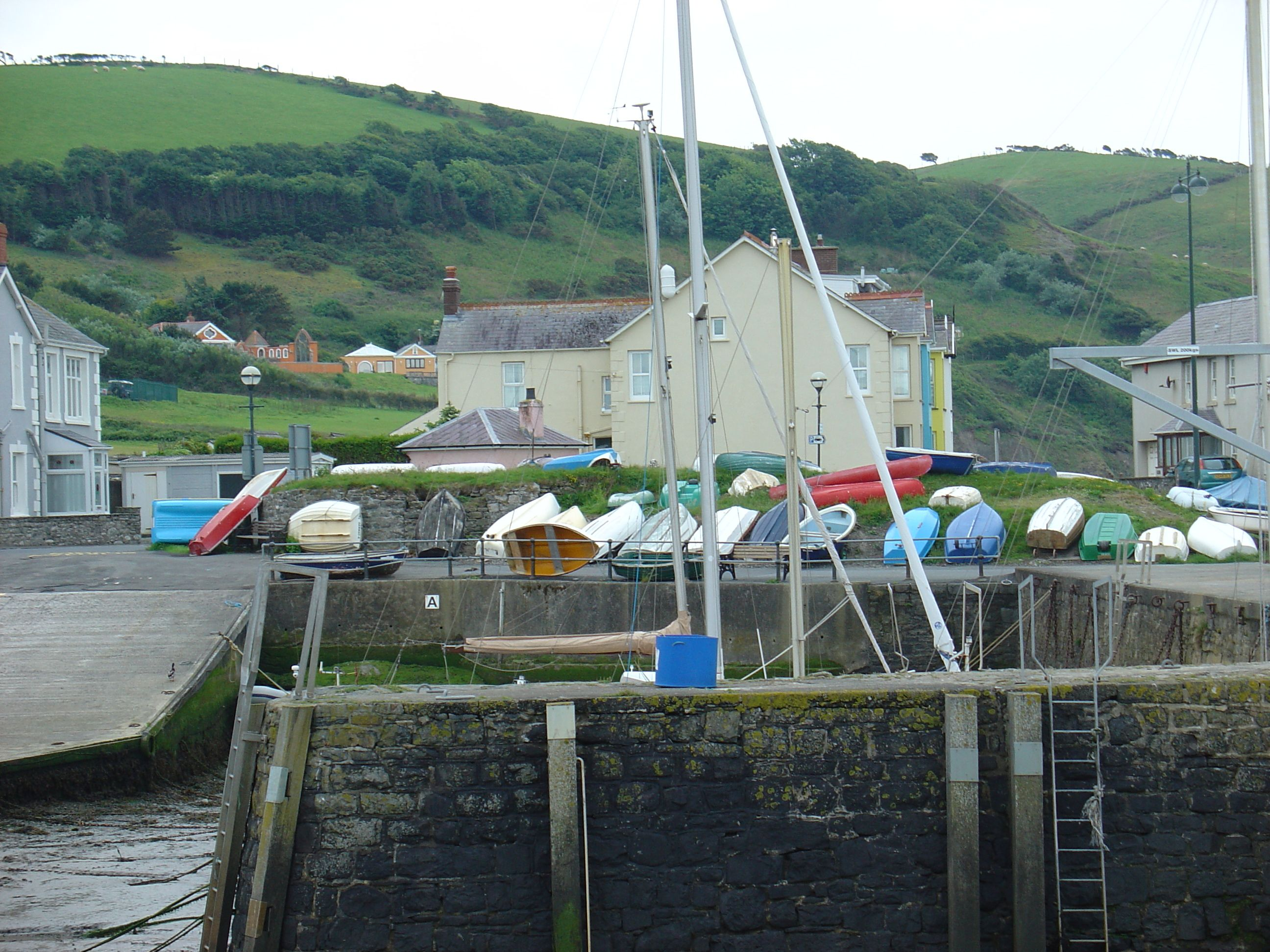
Harbour and hills

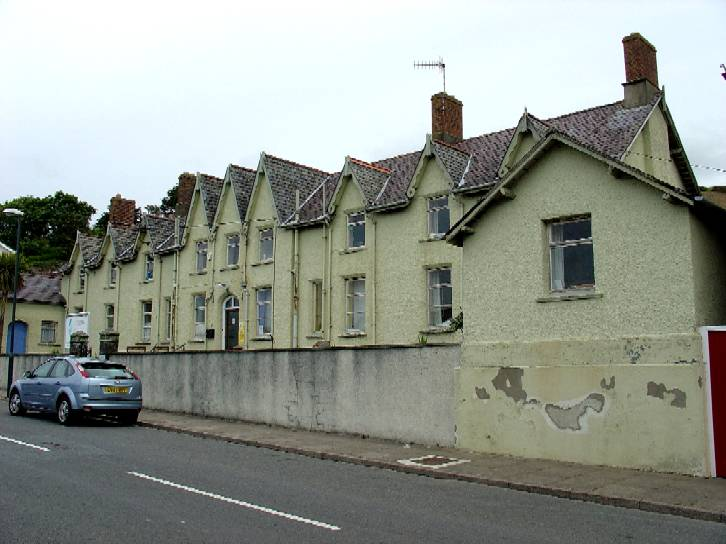
Former workhouse

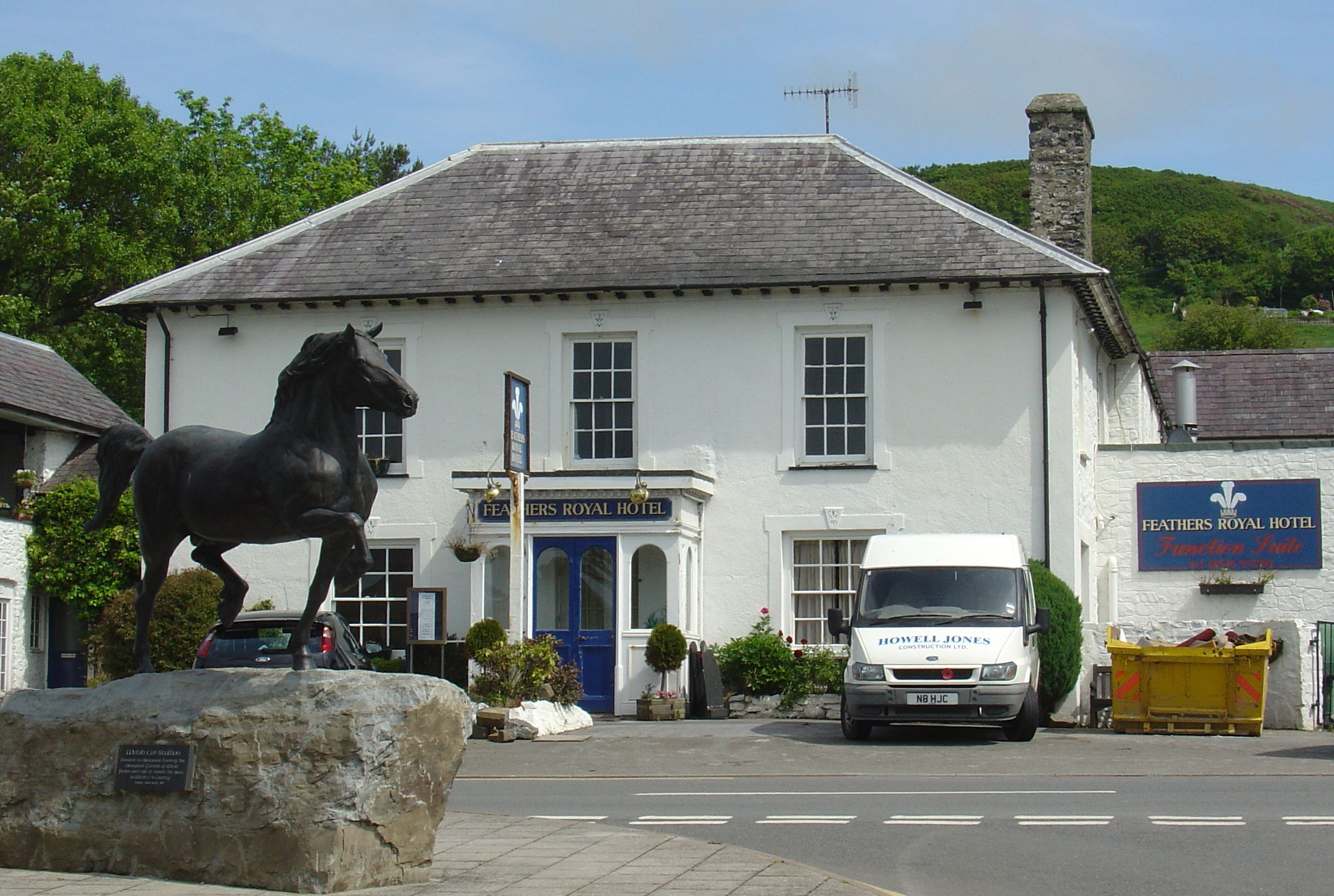
Feathers Royal Hotel (former coaching inn)

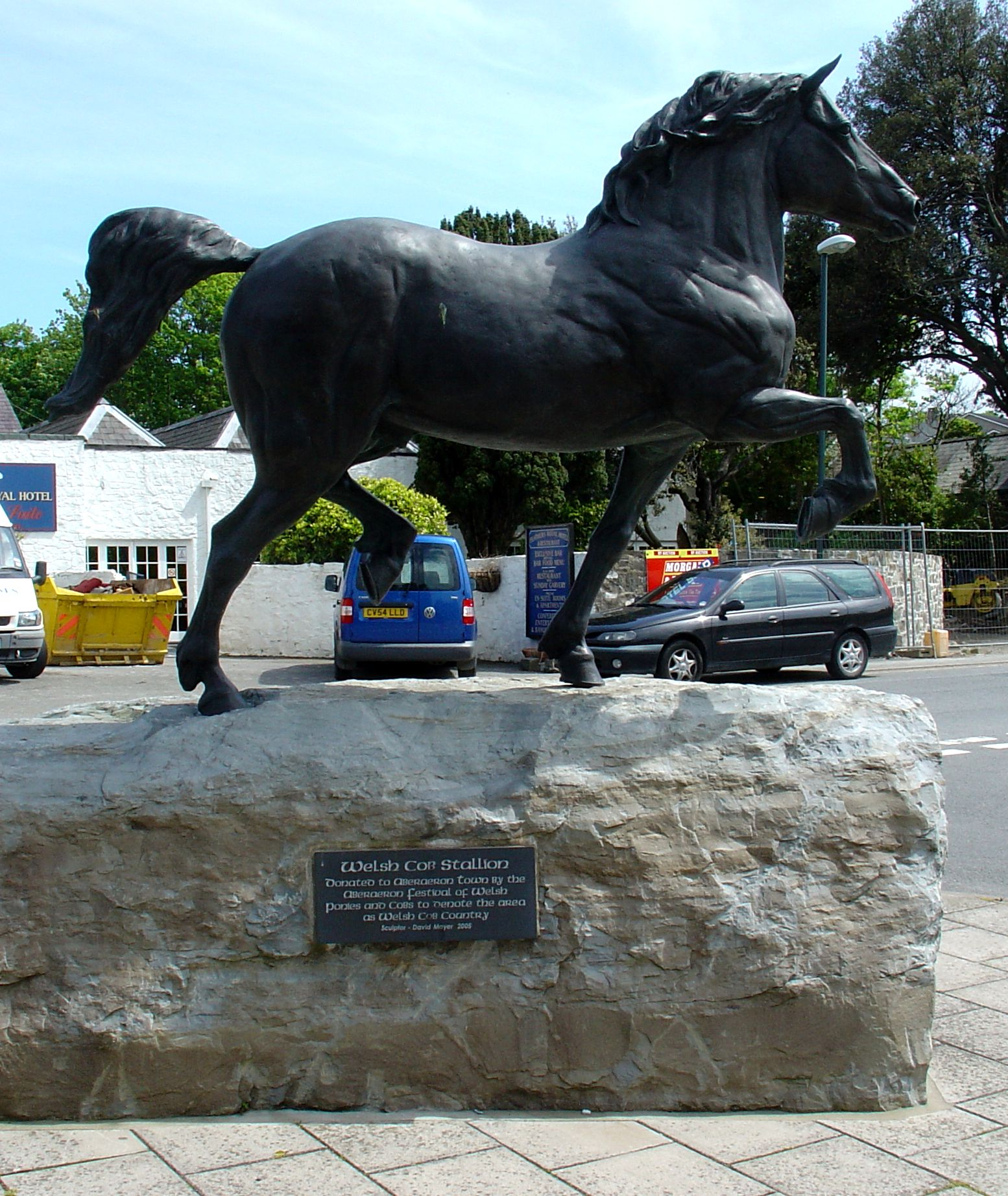
Welsh cob statue

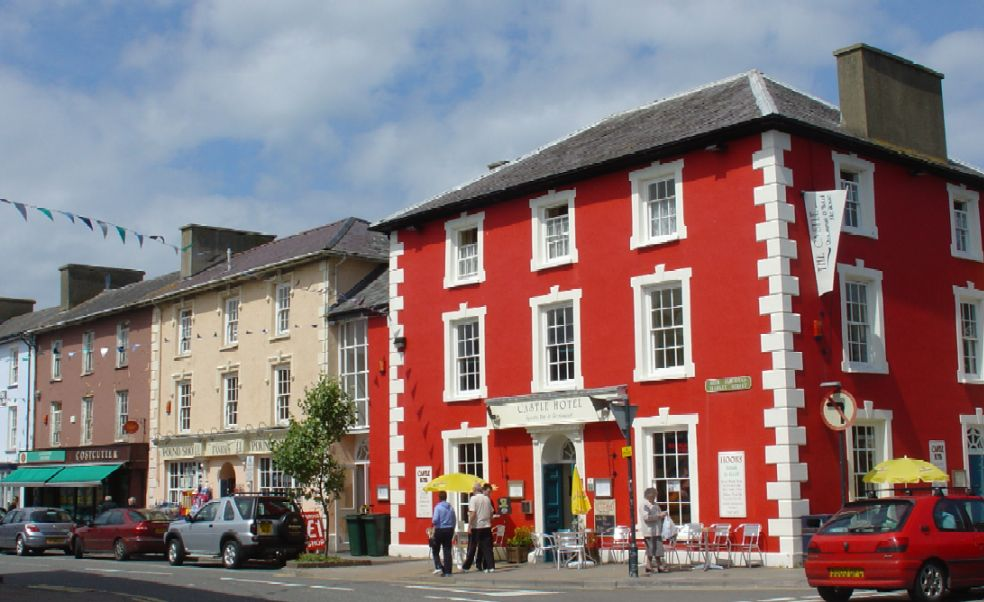
Castle Hotel and Market Street

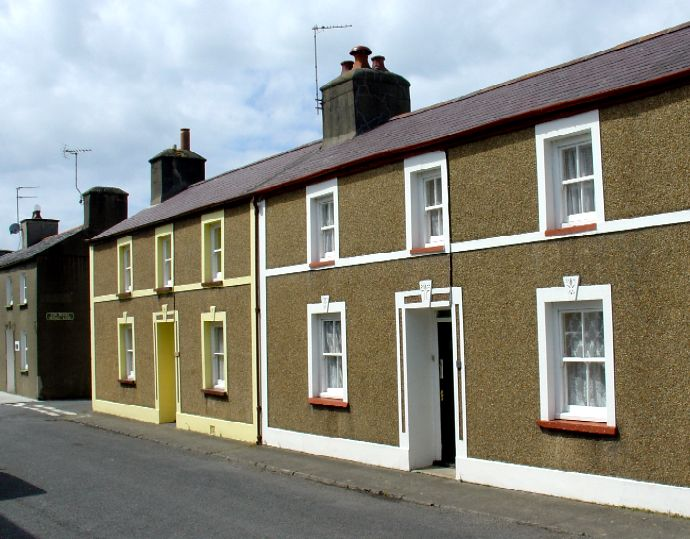
Georgian houses

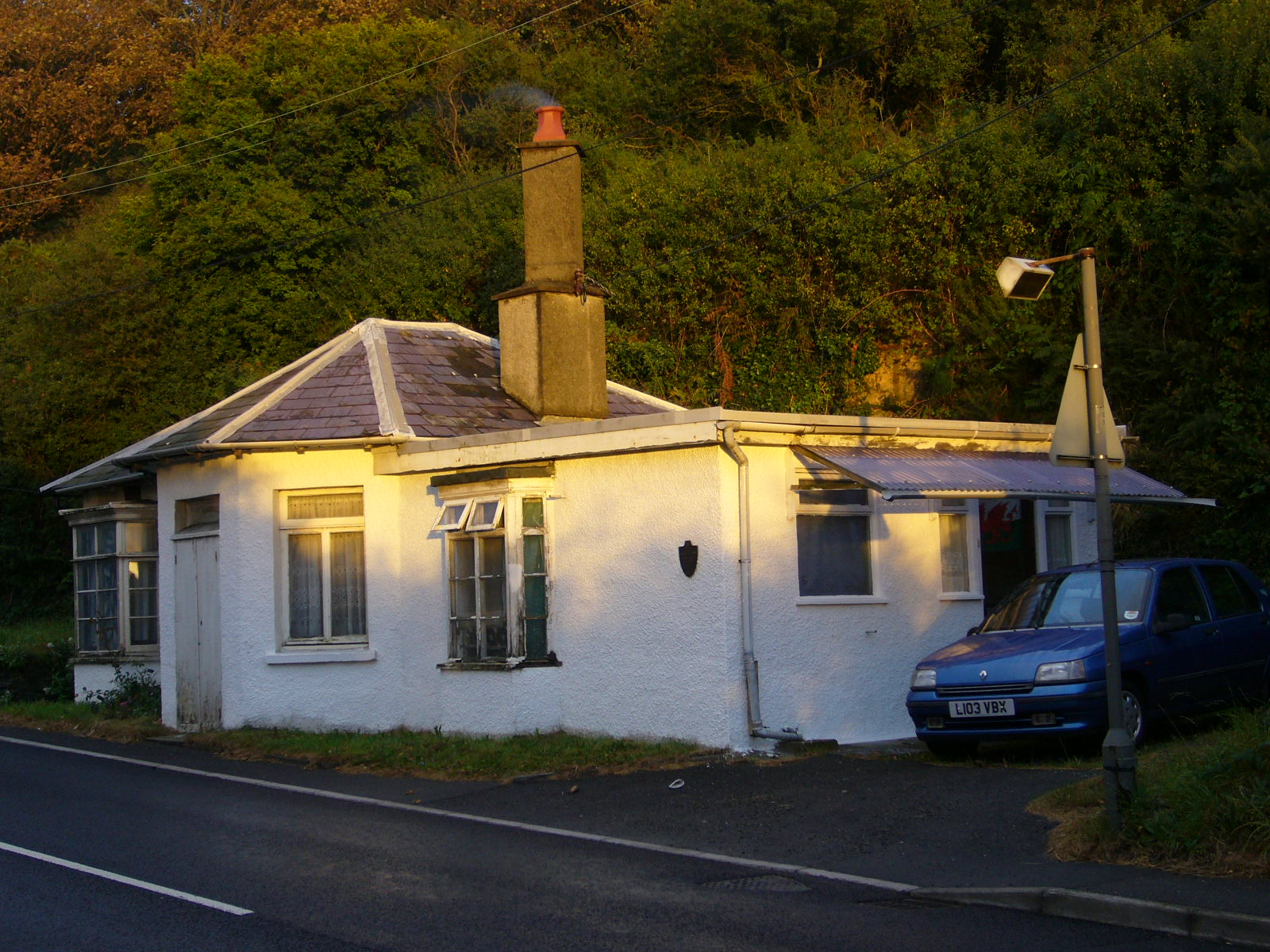
Northgate Toll House, c. 1785

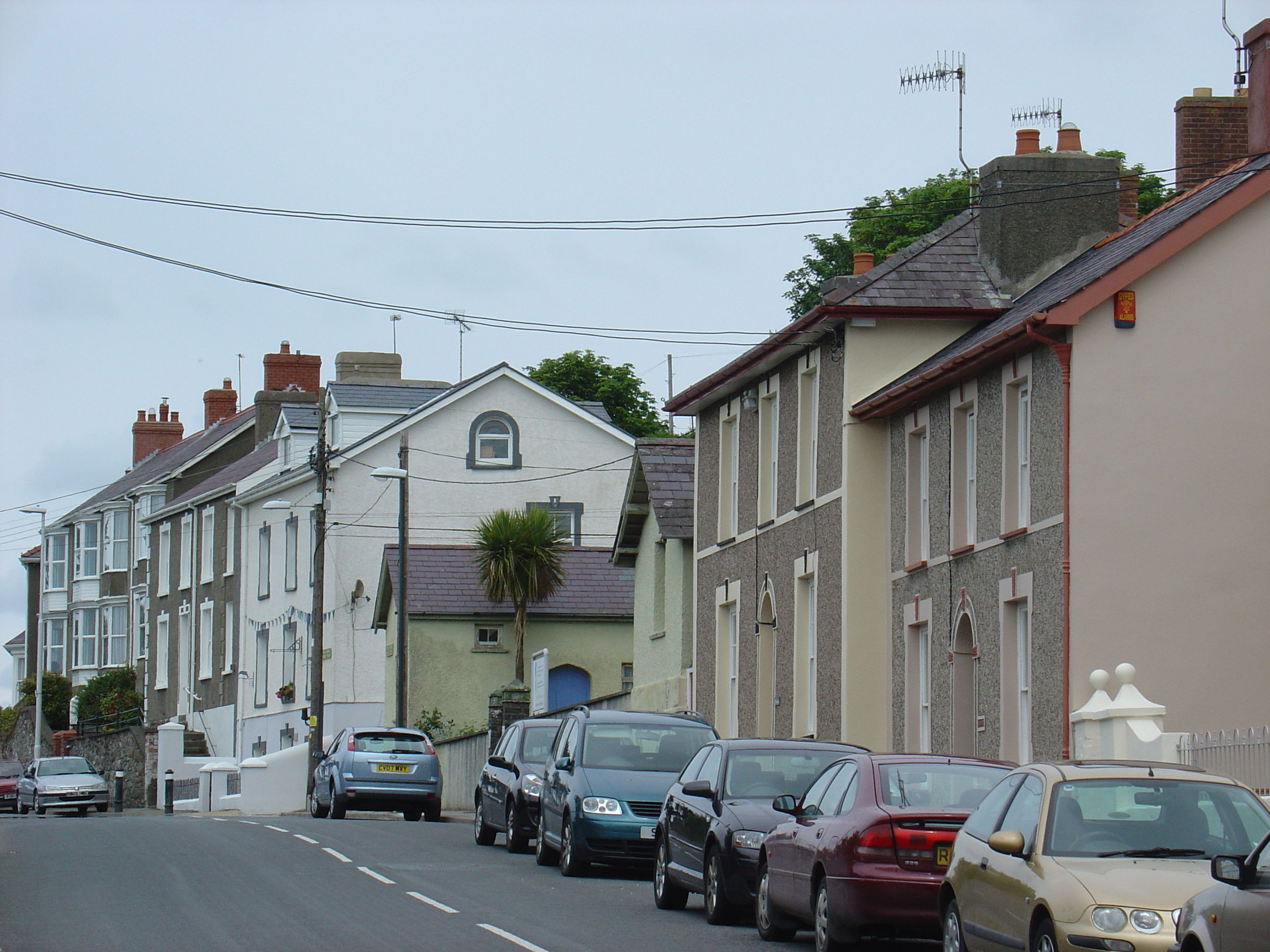
Prince's Avenue
