= A482 road =

Road in Wales

Coordinates: 52.1023°N 4.06232°W

A482

Route information
- Length: 29 mi (47 km)

Major junctions
- Northwest end: Aberaeron
- A487 A485 A475 A483; A40
- Southeast end: Llanwrda

Location
- Country: United Kingdom
- Constituent country: Wales

Road network
- Roads in the United Kingdom; Motorways; A and B road zones

The A482 road is in Ceredigion and Carmarthenshire, Wales. It links Aberaeron at the junction with the A487 road with the A40 road at Llanwrda near Llandovery. It is 29 miles (47 km) long.

== History ==
Originally, the road from Aberaeron to Lampeter was styled the B4340. By 1927, it had been upgraded to the A4115. In 1935, during a widespread revision of road numbering, the Newcastle Emlyn to Lampeter road became the A475 and the number A482 was allotted to the Aberaeron to Lampeter road. At the eastern end of the road, the original terminus was with the A481 in Landovery, half a mile from where that road joins the A40. This changed with the 1936 revision and the eastern terminus of the A482 was rerouted to Llanwrda.

== Route ==
The route from Aberaeron, where it branches off the A487, joins the A40 at Llanwrda, is generally orientated from northwest to southeast. Running through the pleasant countryside of the Aeron Valley, it passes the Grade I listed manor house of Llanerchaeron near Ciliau Aeron. The B4339 branches off to the right and the A482 continues to the village of Ystrad Aeron where the B4342 branches off to the right. After continuing through the village of Temple Bar, it enters Lampeter to join the A485 road. Within a few hundred yards the A475 road branches off to the right and just south of the town the A482 crosses the River Teifi and enters Carmarthenshire and the A485 Carmarthen road branches off to the right. Still travelling southeastwards, the A482 climbs to higher elevations and passes through grasslands and wooded areas. It crosses the River Cothi at Pumsaint and continues winding through rural scenery to Llanwrda.

== See also ==
- British road numbering scheme
