= Grade II* listed buildings in Ceredigion =

Ceredigion shown within Wales

In the United Kingdom, the term listed building refers to a building or other structure officially designated as being of special architectural, historical, or cultural significance; Grade II* structures are those considered to be "particularly important buildings of more than special interest". Listing was begun by a provision in the Town and Country Planning Act 1947. Once listed, strict limitations are imposed on the modifications allowed to a building's structure or fittings. In Wales, the authority for listing under the Planning (Listed Buildings and Conservation Areas) Act 1990 rests with Cadw.

== Buildings ==
Name	Location Grid Ref. (Note: Sometimes known as OSGB36, the grid reference is based on the British national grid reference system used by the Ordnance Survey.) Geo-coordinates	Date Listed	Function	Notes	Reference Number	Image
Church of All Saints, Llanfair Clydogau	Cellan, Llanfair Clydogau; SN6135549746; 52°07′43″N 4°01′37″W	3 June 1964	Church	Situated some 1.2 km NE of Cellan village, on N side of B4343 to Llanfair.	9759	See more images
Church of Saint David, Llanarth	Llanarth; SN4229457749; 52°11′43″N 4°18′32″W	6 March 1964	Church	Situated in Llanarth village on hill W of main road.	9768	See more images
Mynachdy	Dyffryn Arth; SN5043561992; 52°14′09″N 4°11′30″W	6 March 1964	House	Situated some 1.5 km SSW of Pennant on W side of road to Ciliau Aeron.	9801	Mynachdy
Church of St. Ffraed, Llansantffraid	Llansantffraid; SN5124667491; 52°17′07″N 4°10′56″W	6 March 1964	Church	Situated at the end of Stryd-y-Eglwys from Llanon, some 350m E of the coast at Llansantffraed and 50m N of the Afon Peris.	9815	See more images
Plas Gwyn, Llansantffraid, Ceredigion	Llansantffraid; SN5274568352; 52°17′37″N 4°09′38″W	6 March 1964	House	Situated some 1.5km NE of Llanon approached by a 250m drive S of the A487.	9816	Upload Photo
Plas y Wern	Llanarth; SN4155158539; 52°12′08″N 4°19′12″W	28 February 1952	House	Situated on E side of B4342, about 1 km NNW of Llanarth.	9819	Upload Photo
Derry Ormond Tower	Llangybi; SN5898351680; 52°08′43″N 4°03′44″W	28 February 1952	Tower	Situated very prominently overlooking the Dulas valley from a 219 m spur of hill between the two minor valleys of the Afon Denys and Nant Dyfel. Reached across fields from Penparc Farm.	9820	See more images
Dyfi Furnace	Ysgubor y Coed; SN6849595146; 52°32′18″N 3°56′25″W	31 May 1972	Furnace	Situated in Furnace by the bridge.	9822	See more images
Church of Saint Ilar, Llanilar	Llanilar; SN6237975101; 52°21′24″N 4°01′20″W	21 January 1964	Church	Situated in large churchyard in the centre of the village.	9840	See more images
Mabws Hall	Llanrhystyd; SN5653468549; 52°17′47″N 4°06′19″W	21 October 1964	House	In Cwm Mabws. Reached at end of driveway off E side of road, 1km NE of Rhyd-Rosser.	9842	Mabws Hall
St Michael's Church, Llanfihangel y Creuddyn	Trawsgoed; SN6650876051; 52°21′58″N 3°57′43″W	21 January 1964	Church	Situated in centre of the village in large churchyard.	9850	See more images
Eglwys Newydd Church	Pontarfynach; SN7685573639; 52°20′49″N 3°48′33″W	21 January 1964	Church	On the S side of the B4574 and the N side of the Ystwyth valley some 1km NE of the site of Hafod Mansion.	9867	See more images
Devil's Bridge	Pontarfynach; SN7417377026; 52°22′36″N 3°51′00″W	21 January 1964	Bridge	Carrying the A4120 across the gorge of the Afon Mynach on the E side of Devil's Bridge.	9870	See more images
Newcastle Emlyn Bridge	Llandyfriog; SN3091340867; 52°02′25″N 4°28′00″W	21 September 1964	Bridge	Situated between Adpar and Newcastle Emlyn, spanning River Teifi (parish and old county boundary)	9880	Newcastle Emlyn Bridge
Cenarth Bridge	Beulah; SN2691641581; 52°02′44″N 4°31′31″W	21 September 1964	Bridge	Situated on A484, spanning Teifi at Cenarth Falls	9881	See more images
Penylan	Beulah; SN2358043813; 52°03′52″N 4°34′30″W	21 September 1964		Situated down drive from formal entry some 400m NE of Llechryd Water Works, on E side of lane to Neuadd Cross from A 484.	9884	Penylan
Church of St Cynllo, Llangoedmor	Llangoedmor; SN1994445802; 52°04′52″N 4°37′45″W	21 September 1964	Church	Situated on lane between A484 and B4570 some 500m N of Croesllan crossroads.	9890	See more images
Plas Llangoedmore	Llangoedmor; SN1969245957; 52°04′57″N 4°37′58″W	21 September 1964	House	Situated some 700m E of junction of B4570 with A484 to E of Cardigan	9891	Upload Photo
Treforgan	Treforgan, Llangoedmor; SN2011446062; 52°05′01″N 4°37′36″W	21 September 1964	House	Situated above road, approached by drive opposite lane from Llangoedmor Church.	9892	Upload Photo
Pantgwyn	Llangoedmor; SN2394145955; 52°05′02″N 4°34′15″W	21 September 1964		Situated down short drive beginning some 40m N of B4570 crossroads at Penllwyndu.	9893	Upload Photo
Llechryd Bridge	Llangoedmor; SN2179743627; 52°03′44″N 4°36′03″W	21 September 1964	Bridge	Situated across Afon Teifi between Llechryd and Castell Malgwyn lodge.	9895	See more images
Great Abbey Farmhouse including front garden wall	Ystrad Fflur; SN7466265688; 52°16′30″N 3°50′18″W	12 May 1963	Farmhouse	Situated next to Strata Florida Abbey.	9914	Upload Photo
Edward Richard Old Grammar School	Ystrad Meurig; SN7036867670; 52°17′31″N 3°54′08″W	12 May 1963	School	Situated set back from road to W of St John's Church.	9916	Edward Richard Old Grammar School
Capel Gwynfil	Llangeitho; SN6204259792; 52°13′08″N 4°01′15″W	12 May 1963	Chapel	Situated some 200m NE of centre of Llangeitho, on E side of road.	9917	See more images
Church of Saint David, Llanddewi Brefi	Llanddewi Brefi; SN6638355311; 52°10′47″N 3°57′20″W	12 May 1963	Church	Situated in centre of Llanddewi Brefi.	9920	See more images
Pont Gogoyan	Llanddewi Brefi; SN6418054471; 52°10′18″N 3°59′15″W	12 May 1963	Bridge	Situated some 2.25 km WSW of Llanddewi Brefi, on minor road between B4343 and A485.	9921	Pont Gogoyan
No. 10 Alban Square	Aberaeron; SN4597062927; 52°14′35″N 4°15′27″W	28 September 1961			9939	No. 10 Alban Square
No. 11 Alban Square	Aberaeron; SN4597462922; 52°14′34″N 4°15′26″W	28 September 1961	House (Pale yellow)		9940	No. 11 Alban Square
No. 12 Alban Square	Aberaeron; SN4597762916; 52°14′34″N 4°15′26″W	28 September 1961	House (white)		9941	No. 12 Alban Square
No. 13 Alban Square	Aberaeron; SN4598362910; 52°14′34″N 4°15′26″W	28 September 1961	House (Yellow)	Part of NE side of planned square between the Midland Bank (north Road) forming the NW end pavilion, and no 15 the central pavilion.	9942	No. 13 Alban Square
No. 14 Alban Square	Aberaeron; SN4598762904; 52°14′34″N 4°15′26″W	28 September 1961	House (White)		9943	No. 14 Alban Square
No. 15 Alban Square	Aberaeron; SN4599262898; 52°14′34″N 4°15′25″W	28 September 1961	House (Dark Blue/Green)		9944	No. 15 Alban Square
No. 16 Alban Square	Aberaeron; SN4599962889; 52°14′33″N 4°15′25″W	28 September 1961	House (pale green)		9945	No. 16 Alban Square
No. 17 Alban Square	Aberaeron; SN4600662882; 52°14′33″N 4°15′25″W	28 September 1961	House (pink)		9946	No. 17 Alban Square
No. 18 Alban Square	Aberaeron; SN4601162876; 52°14′33″N 4°15′24″W	28 September 1961	House (grey-green)		9947	No. 18 Alban Square
No. 19 Alban Square	Aberaeron; SN4601662868; 52°14′33″N 4°15′24″W	28 September 1961	House (blue)		9948	No. 19 Alban Square
No. 20 Alban Square (Barclay's Bank)	Aberaeron; SN4602162860; 52°14′32″N 4°15′24″W	28 September 1961	Bank		9949	No. 20 Alban Square (Barclay's Bank)
No. 9 Alban Square (HSBC Bank)	Aberaeron; SN4596562932; 52°14′35″N 4°15′27″W	28 September 1961	Bank		10077	No. 9 Alban Square (HSBC Bank)
No. 1 Portland Place	Aberaeron; SN4579162808; 52°14′30″N 4°15′36″W	28 September 1961	House (cream)		10080	No. 1 Portland Place
No. 2 Portland Place (formerly the customs house)	Aberaeron; SN4578362803; 52°14′30″N 4°15′36″W	28 September 1961	House (pink)		10081	No. 2 Portland Place (formerly the customs house)
No. 3 Portland Place	Aberaeron; SN4577662797; 52°14′30″N 4°15′37″W	28 September 1961	House (magenta)		10082	No. 3 Portland Place
No. 4 Portland Place	Aberaeron; SN4576962792; 52°14′30″N 4°15′37″W	28 September 1961	House (dark blue)		10083	No. 4 Portland Place
No. 5 Portland Place	Aberaeron; SN4576162787; 52°14′30″N 4°15′37″W	28 September 1961	House (pale purple)		10084	No. 5 Portland Place
No. 6 Portland Place	Aberaeron; SN4575362783; 52°14′30″N 4°15′38″W	28 September 1961	House (pale green)		10085	No. 6 Portland Place
No. 7 Portland Place	Aberaeron; SN4574662778; 52°14′29″N 4°15′38″W	28 September 1961	House		10086	No. 7 Portland Place
Assembly Rooms, Laura Place	Aberystwyth; SN5810981590; 52°24′50″N 4°05′16″W	21 July 1961	Assembly rooms	At the west end of the street with rear elevation overlooking Laura Place and the Parish Church.	10242	Assembly Rooms, Laura Place
No. 1 Laura Place	Aberystwyth; SN5809181690; 52°24′53″N 4°05′17″W	21 July 1961		Planned terrace overlooking Laura Gardens and the Parish Church to W; stepped in the slope between King Street and New Street. Named after Laura Powell, nee. Phelps, who married W E Powell of Nanteos.	10257	No. 1 Laura Place
No. 2 Laura Place	Aberystwyth; SN5809581680; 52°24′53″N 4°05′16″W	21 July 1961	House	Planned terrace overlooking Laura Gardens and the Parish church to W; stepped in the slope between King Street and New Street. Named after Laura Powell, nee. Phelps, who married W E Powell of Nanteos.	10258	No. 2 Laura Place
No. 3 Laura Place	Aberystwyth; SN5809881672; 52°24′53″N 4°05′16″W	21 July 1961	House	Planned terrace overlooking Laura Gardens and the Parish church to W; stepped in the slope between King Street and New Street. Named after Laura Powell, nee. Phelps, who married W E Powell of Nanteos.	10259	No. 3 Laura Place
No. 4 Laura Place	Aberystwyth; SN5810281664; 52°24′52″N 4°05′16″W	21 July 1961	House	Planned terrace overlooking Laura Gardens and the Parish church to W; stepped in the slope between King Street and New Street. Named after Laura Powell, nee. Phelps, who married W E Powell of Nanteos.	10260	No. 4 Laura Place
No. 5 Laura Place	Aberystwyth; SN5810681655; 52°24′52″N 4°05′16″W	21 July 1961	House	Planned terrace overlooking Laura Gardens and the Parish church to W; stepped in the slope between King Street and New Street. Named after Laura Powell, nee. Phelps, who married W E Powell of Nanteos.	10261	No. 5 Laura Place
No. 6 Laura Place	Aberystwyth; SN5810981647; 52°24′52″N 4°05′16″W	21 July 1961	House	Planned terrace overlooking Laura Gardens and the Parish church to W; stepped in the slope between King Street and New Street. Named after Laura Powell, nee. Phelps, who married W E Powell of Nanteos.	10262	No. 6 Laura Place
No. 7 Laura Place (the rectory)	Aberystwyth; SN5811881632; 52°24′51″N 4°05′15″W	21 July 1961	House		10263	No. 7 Laura Place (the rectory)
No. 8 Laura Place	Aberystwyth; SN5811981623; 52°24′51″N 4°05′15″W	21 July 1961	House		10264	No. 8 Laura Place
No. 9 Laura Place (staff house)	Aberystwyth; SN5812581611; 52°24′51″N 4°05′15″W	21 July 1961	House		10265	No. 9 Laura Place (staff house)
No. 11 Laura Place	Aberystwyth; SN5808981577; 52°24′49″N 4°05′17″W	21 July 1961	House	To W of the former Assembly Rooms, above and to the S of the Parish church; on sloping ground. At one time the town house and estate office of the Powells of Nanteos.	10266	No. 11 Laura Place
No. 12 Laura Place	Aberystwyth; SN5808081574; 52°24′49″N 4°05′17″W	21 July 1961		To W of the former Assembly Rooms, above and to the S of the Parish church; on sloping ground. At one time the town house and estate office of the Powells of Nanteos.	10267	No. 12 Laura Place
No. 46 Marine Terrace	Aberystwyth; SN5836582084; 52°25′06″N 4°05′03″W	24 November 1987	House	Royal Commission on the Ancient and Historical Monuments of Wales	10291	No. 46 Marine Terrace
National Library of Wales	Aberystwyth; SN5941581622; 52°24′52″N 4°04′06″W	21 July 1961	Library	Prominent elevated site facing W above the town centre, reached by a road off Penglais Hill.	10417	See more images
St David's Building, University of Wales Trinity Saint David	Lampeter; SN5791648221; 52°06′50″N 4°04′35″W	21 September 1964	University		10431	See more images
Cardigan Bridge	Cardigan; SN1777845818; 52°04′50″N 4°39′39″W	14 April 1992	Bridge		10456	See more images
Castle Green House	Cardigan; SN1779845947; 52°04′54″N 4°39′38″W	16 June 1961	House		10459	See more images
Parish church of St Mary, Cardigan	Cardigan; SN1810246043; 52°04′58″N 4°39′22″W	16 June 1961	Church		10476	See more images
Cardigan Guildhall and markets	Cardigan; SN1777146164; 52°05′01″N 4°39′40″W	16 June 1961	Guildhall		10479	See more images
The Old Shire Hall	Cardigan; SN1773145978; 52°04′55″N 4°39′41″W	16 June 1961	Shire Hall	South end of High Street	10488	See more images
No. 7 St Mary's Street	Cardigan; SN1781546021; 52°04′57″N 4°39′37″W	16 June 1961	House		10529	Upload Photo
No. 40 St Mary's Street (Avondale)	Cardigan; SN1786446005; 52°04′56″N 4°39′34″W	14 April 1992	House		10539	Upload Photo
Bethania Baptist Chapel	Cardigan; SN1790446187; 52°05′02″N 4°39′33″W	14 April 1992	Chapel		10545	See more images
Railings, gates and gatepiers at Bethania Baptist Chapel	Cardigan; SN1790546201; 52°05′03″N 4°39′33″W	14 April 1992			10546	See more images
Bryn-y-Mor	Cardigan; SN1689647352; 52°05′39″N 4°40′28″W	22 August 1986	House		10547	Bryn-y-Mor
Albro Castle	Cardigan; SN1604046729; 52°05′18″N 4°41′11″W	14 April 1992	Workhouse	Situated down track running west off Poppit Road, just on St Dogmael's north boundary.	10556	Albro Castle
Church of St Tysul	Llandysul; SN4190340692; 52°02′31″N 4°18′24″W	21 September 1964	Church	Situated by River Teifi in large churchyard.	10574	See more images
Alltyrodyn Hall	Llandysul; SN4499144240; 52°04′29″N 4°15′48″W	13 January 1993		Includes rear courtyard and bell tower	10643	Upload Photo
Capel Llwynrhydowen	Llandysul; SN4436545211; 52°05′00″N 4°16′22″W	21 September 1964	Chapel		10655	Upload Photo
Gelli, Nantcwnlle	Nantcwnlle; SN5460657302; 52°11′41″N 4°07′43″W	14 January 1977		Situated some 400m NW of Trefilan, approached by two drives off minor lane to Cilcennin.	10689	Upload Photo
Plas Abermad	Llanilar; SN6002476089; 52°21′54″N 4°03′26″W	20 December 1989	House	Set in its own grounds on the floor of the Ystwyth Valley. Reached by short drive curving N off the A485 midway between Llanfarian and Llanilar.	10710	Plas Abermad
Church of St Peter, Ceulanamaesmawr	Ceulanamaesmawr; SN6841286457; 52°27′37″N 3°56′17″W	18 July 1990	Church	Situated in village on S side of lane running ENE from main valley road, about 150m E of junction.	10712	See more images
Billiard Room at Llanerchaeron	Ciliau Aeron; SN4795460219; 52°13′09″N 4°13′38″W	6 March 1964	Billiard room	Detached building situated on E side of rear approach to main house, some 10m NE of entry to rear court.	10716	Upload Photo
Edward Davies memorial chemical laboratories	Aberystwyth; SN5880781537; 52°24′49″N 4°04′39″W	19 December 1986	Art school	Elevated above the town on Buarth Mawr; set into the hillside.	10729	See more images
Hafod Arms Hotel	Pontarfynach; SN7410577044; 52°22′37″N 3°51′03″W	30 July 1991	Hotel	Facing N on the bend in the road immediately W of the famous Devil's Bridge and Mynach Falls and at the junction with the B4574.	10734	See more images
Church of St Cynllo	Llangynllo (in Troedyraur); SN3518743946; 52°04′09″N 4°24′22″W	2 October 1994	Church	Situated by Glebe Farm, some 1km SSW of Coedybryn and some 4 km SW of Ffostrasol, off B4334 running SE.	10831	See more images
Pontbrenmydyr	Henfynyw; SN4761160100; 52°13′05″N 4°13′56″W	3 August 1994		Set into the slope above Afon Mydyr, in sight of Llanerchaeron House. Reached off the E side of the A482 down a short lane past Minafon.	14427	Upload Photo
St Michael's Church, Tremain	Y Ferwig; SN2353848633; 52°06′28″N 4°34′41″W	3 June 1995	Church	Situated near a minor road 200m S of A487 at Tremain.	15871	See more images
Tre-berfedd including kitchen wing forward on right	Llanfihangel Ystrad; SN5031654622; 52°10′10″N 4°11′25″W	20 March 1996	Farmhouse	Farm at end of short track off E side of Cribyn-Dihewyd by-road. Situated approximately 0.75km SE of Dihewyd.	16591	Upload Photo
Trawsgoed House	Trawsgoed; SN6707073076; 52°20′23″N 3°57′09″W	9 June 1996	Country House	Situated in own grounds on E side of Afon Ystwyth, approached by drive from lodge some 150m N of Pont Trawsgoed.	17258	See more images
Felin-hafodwen	Llanfihangel Ystrad; SN5159750916; 52°08′12″N 4°10′11″W	18 October 1996	Mill	Situated on E side of by-road, some 0.5km SW of Cribyn.	17436	Upload Photo
Ynys-felen	Llanfihangel Ystrad; SN4957954523; 52°10′06″N 4°12′03″W	18 October 1996	House	At end of track off E side of Dihewyd-Troedyrhiw by-road, 1.8km SE of Dihewyd.	17442	Upload Photo
Ty Glyn including attached wings to main gable ends	Dyffryn Arth; SN4986459896; 52°13′00″N 4°11′57″W	6 March 1964	House	Situated about 1 km N of Ciliau Aeron by junction of roads to Aberarth and to Pennant.	17509	Upload Photo
Capel Eidalwyr	Llandyfriog; SN3566740177; 52°02′08″N 4°23′50″W	6 April 1996		Detached utilitarian building towards SE corner of caravan park, which is located on the E side of the B4334, 0.3 km SW of Henllan.	17608	See more images
Pont Allt-y-Cafan	Llandyfriog; SN3867539209; 52°01′40″N 4°21′10″W	6 April 1996	Bridge	Deep valley setting, carrying Horeb to Pentre-cwrt by-road over River Teifi (parish and old county boundary). 0.3km S of Pentre-cwrt. Also in Carmarthenshire.	17613	Pont Allt-y-Cafan
Dolwerdd	Nantcwnlle; SN5656756955; 52°11′32″N 4°05′59″W	26 November 1996		Situated behind farm-buildings of Gwastod, some 0.5 km NE of Abermeurig house.	17797	Upload Photo
Llanon Cottage	Llansantffraid; SN5147366845; 52°16′47″N 4°10′43″W	30 April 1996	House	Situated some 50m off the E side of Bridge Street, Llanon, on the E side of Heol Non.	17894	Llanon Cottage
Felin Geri	Beulah; SN3004042306; 52°03′11″N 4°28′49″W	15 March 1996	Mill	Situated about 1 km E of Cwm Cou, in Ceri valley, on S side of lane.	17953	Upload Photo
Noyadd Trefawr	Beulah; SN2583946224; 52°05′13″N 4°32′36″W	21 September 1964		Situated some 400m N of Neuadd Cross, on E side of lane to Blaenannerch.	17967	Upload Photo
Church of St Michael, Eglwys Fach	Ysgubor y Coed; SN6856295528; 52°32′30″N 3°56′22″W	17 February 1997	Church	Situated at S end of village in large churchyard, with lych-gate to road.	18242	See more images
Crugiau	Llanfarian; SN5913879406; 52°23′40″N 4°04′18″W	17 September 1987		Situated down drive leading W from the A487 at Rhydyfelin from Crugiau Lodge.	18288	Upload Photo
Rhiwson Uchaf house-and-byre	Llanwenog; SN5047346815; 52°05′58″N 4°11′04″W	25 April 1997		Situated some 600m NNE of Drefach, reached by minor lane running NNE of B4338, and down drive from right angle bend at Rhiwson Isaf.	18374	Upload Photo
Ceulan Mills	Ceulanamaesmawr; SN6558489413; 52°29′10″N 3°58′51″W	19 September 1997	Mill	Situated behind houses on main road, on W bank of Ceulan, approached through grounds of Glenydd and Wern.	18885	Upload Photo
Bethel Independent Chapel, Ceulanamaesmawr	Tal-y-bont, Ceulanamaesmawr; SN6549689557; 52°29′14″N 3°58′56″W	19 September 1997	Chapel	Situated towards N end of Talybont, adjoining and to N of Tabernacle Chapel, both behind matching iron railings.	18891	See more images
Capel Soar and attached house	Llanddewi Brefi; SN7846953283; 52°09′52″N 3°46′42″W	30 September 1997	Chapel	Situated in extreme isolation on W bank of the Camddwr some 13 km from Tregaron, reached via the Abergwesyn road to Nant-y-maen and then the road S towards Llyn Brianne reservoir.	18943	See more images
All Saints' Church, Llangorwen	Llangorwen, Tirymynach; SN6033883832; 52°26′04″N 4°03′21″W	11 December 1997	Church	Situated in Clarach valley, on E side of B 4572 just S of Clarach crossroads and just N of Pont Llangorwen.	19068	See more images
St David's Church, Capel Bangor	Capel Bangor, Melindwr; SN6561280129; 52°24′09″N 3°58′37″W	1 February 1998	Church	Situated just S of A44 about 50m down road to Cwm Rheidol on W side of road.	19170	See more images
Stable court at Nanteos, including attached outbuilding to S	Llanfarian; SN6206278639; 52°23′18″N 4°01′42″W	24 February 2004	Stables	Situated on rising ground to the north east of Nanteos Mansion, with entrance on E side.	82510	Stable court at Nanteos, including attached outbuilding to S
Barn above Dyfi Furnace	Ysgubor y Coed; SN6849495099; 52°32′16″N 3°56′25″W	23 November 2004	Barn	Situated on slope behind the Dyfi Furnace, reached by footpath.	83255	Upload Photo
Ynys Greigiog	Ysgubor y Coed; SN6734394809; 52°32′06″N 3°57′26″W	23 November 2004		Situated down drive of some 600m running N from A487 opposite Ty-hir, 1.5 km SW of Furnace.	83276	Upload Photo
The Jubilee Arch	Hafod estate, Pontarfynach; SN7651975561; 52°21′51″N 3°48′54″W	16 March 2005	Bridge	Crossing the B4574 some 2.8km SE of Devil's Bridge.	84267	See more images

== See also ==
- Grade I listed buildings in Ceredigion
- Scheduled monuments in Ceredigion
- Registered historic parks and gardens in Ceredigion
