= County Hall, Aberaeron =

Municipal Building in Aberaeron, Wales

- Neuadd y Sir Aberaeron (Welsh)
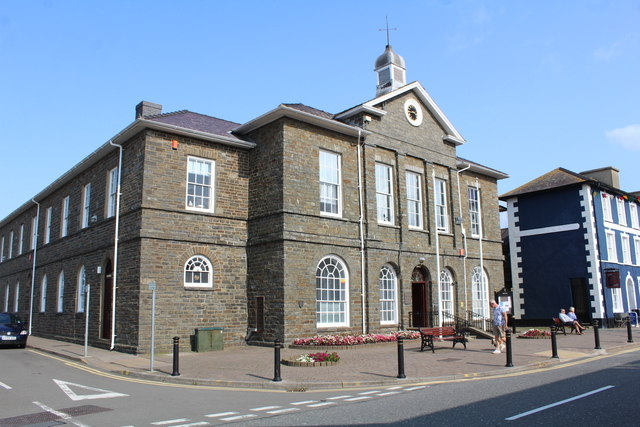
- County Hall, Aberaeron

- Shown in Ceredigion
- 52.2429°N 4.2598°W
- Location: Market Street, Aberaeron

History
- Built: 1846

Site notes
- Architect: Edward Haycock
- Architectural style: Neoclassical style

Listed Building – Grade II
- Official name: Town Hall
- Designated: 28 September 1961
- Reference no.: 10040

County Hall (Welsh: Neuadd y Sir Aberaeron), formerly Aberaeron Town Hall (Welsh: Neuadd y Dref Aberaeron), is a municipal building in Market Street, Aberaeron, Ceredigion, Wales. The structure, which is now used as a public library, is a Grade II listed building.

== History ==
The building was commissioned by Colonel Alban Thomas Jones Gwynne (1783 – 1861), whose father had inherited the Monachty Mansion and had used his wealth to develop the town. The site Colonel Gwynne selected in Market Street had been occupied by the Middle Aberaeron Farmhouse (Welsh: Ffermdy Aberaeron Ganol). Construction of the new building, which was initially conceived as a market hall, began in 1833. It was designed by Edward Haycock from Shrewsbury in the neoclassical style, built by William Green of Aberaeron in sandstone and was completed in 1846.

The design involved a symmetrical main frontage with five bays facing onto Market Street. The central section of three bays, which slightly projected forward, featured three openings with voussoirs on the ground floor and three sash windows on the first floor. The first floor windows were flanked by pilasters supporting an open pediment with a clock in the tympanum. The outer bays also contained openings with voussoirs on the ground floor and sash windows on the first floor, and there was a central lantern on the roof. Internally, the principal rooms were the market hall on the ground floor and the courtroom on the first floor.

The courtroom became the venue for the quarter session and the petty session hearings, the latter of which, until 1846, had taken place at the Feathers Hotel. Following significant population growth, largely associated with the tourism industry, the area became an urban district in 1894. However, the Market Street building remained reserved for judicial use and the new urban district council established their offices in Alban Square. Market trading on the ground floor of the Market Street building continued until well into the 20th century. Wings, set back from the building, were added to accommodate administrative staff for Cardiganshire County Council in 1910 and, from that time, the building, which had previously been known as "Aberaeron Town Hall", was referred to as the "County Hall".

The wings were extended down Victoria Street to a design by the county architect, Rhys Jones, in 1950, although, by that time, the county council had established a permanent base at Swyddfa'r Sir in Aberystwyth. Departments of the county council which remained based in the Market Street building in Aberaeron included the departments of the county surveyor and the county architect. Following local government re-organisation in 1974, the planning department of Dyfed County Council was based in the building, and, following the establishment of unitary authorities in 1996, various departments including the highways department of Ceredigion County Council were based there.

The Welsh Grand Committee of the House of Commons met in the building in February 1998. After the county council moved out to new offices at Llanbadarn Fawr in 2009, the building's primary use was to accommodate the local public library.
