= Listed buildings in Church Pulverbatch =

Church Pulverbatch is a civil parish in Shropshire, England. It contains 19 listed buildings that are recorded in the National Heritage List for England. Of these, two are listed at Grade II*, the middle of the three grades, and the others are at Grade II, the lowest grade. The parish is mainly rural, but most of the listed buildings are in the village of Church Pulverbatch. The buildings include houses and associated structures, farmhouses, farm buildings, a church and items in the churchyard, and a public house.

== Key ==
Grade	Criteria
II*	Particularly important buildings of more than special interest
II	Buildings of national importance and special interest

== Buildings ==
Name and location	Photograph	Date	Notes	Grade
Walleybourne Farmhouse; 52.63493°N 2.84965°W	—	c. 1400	A manor house, later a farmhouse, it has a timber framed core, and was later encased in brick. There is a hall range, and a later cross-wing to the west. The house has two storeys, a dentilled eaves cornice, and a tile roof. The windows are a mix of casements and sashes. Above the doorway is a pediment, and inside there are three base cruck trusses.	II*
White Horse Inn; 52.61601°N 2.85164°W		14th or 15th century	Originally a farmhouse, later a public house, it was remodelled in the early 17th century, and considerably altered and extended in the 19th century. It is timber framed with cruck construction, and has a tile roof. There is a main range and a gabled projection on the left, two storeys, and a cellar under the left range. The later part has a dentilled eaves cornice, and the windows are casements. On the front is a 20th-century lean-to verandah, and inside are three full cruck trusses.	II
Barn, Sheppen Fields; 52.60431°N 2.84988°W	—	Mid 15th century (probable)	Originally a longhouse, later a barn, it was extended by the addition of a cross-wing in about 1625. The barn is timber framed with cruck construction, partly weatherboarded, and partly encased in brick and stone, and has a roof of corrugated iron. Inside are four full cruck trusses.	II
Dingleside, Old Stores and The Square; 52.62148°N 2.84036°W	—	15th or 16th century	A farmhouse that was remodelled in the 17th century, extended in the 19th century and divided into three dwellings. The building is timber framed and roughcast and has tiled roofs. It has an L-shaped plan, with a hall range and an extended cross-wing on the left. There is a gabled timber porch, the windows are casements, and there is a gabled eaves dormer.	II
Barns, Wilderley Hall; 52.61085°N 2.83668°W	—	Early 17th century	Two barns at right angles forming an L-shaped plan, they are timber framed and weatherboarded, with corrugated iron cladding and corrugated iron roofs. The openings include a raking eaves dormer, and a doorway with a carved scrolled head.	II
Prestley Farmhouse; 52.62677°N 2.88056°W	—	17th century	The farmhouse is in rendered timber framing and has a tile roof. There is one storey and an attic, two bays, and a later single-storey extension on the right. On the front are two casement windows, two gabled eaves dormers, and a gabled porch.	II
Wrentnall Cottages; 52.62784°N 2.84993°W	—	17th century	A farmhouse divided into two cottages, it is timber framed with brick infill, partly on a red brick plinth, and has a tile roof. There is one storey and attics, and four bays. The windows are casements, there are two doors with gabled hoods, and three gabled eaves dormers.	II
Bank Farmhouse; 52.62123°N 2.86272°W	—	Mid to late 17th century	A farmhouse, later a private house, it is timber framed with brick infill on a stone plinth, and has a slate roof. It has one storey and an attic, and two bays. The windows are casements, and there are two gabled eaves dormers.	II
Lower House; 52.62072°N 2.84253°W	—	Early to mid 18th century	The house incorporates a 17th-century three-bay timber framed house. It is in red brick on a moulded stone plinth, with quoins, a parapet, and a tile roof. There are 2½ storeys, five bays, and two gabled ranges at the rear. The central doorway has a canopied hood on scrolled cast iron brackets. The windows are sashes with keystones and moulded stone sills.	II
Gate piers, gates and railings, Lower House; 52.62064°N 2.84249°W	—	1757	The gate piers are dated, and the gates and railings probably date from the 19th century. The piers are in sandstone and have a square section, moulded capping, and grooved ball finials. The gates and railings are in wrought iron, and the railings flank the path to the house.	II
St Edith's Church; 52.62101°N 2.84350°W		1773	The oldest part of the church is the tower, the body of the church being rebuilt in 1852–53 by Edward Haycock in Decorated style. The church is built in stone and has tile roofs. It consists of a nave and a chancel in one cell, a north aisle, a south porch, and a west tower. The tower is in Classical style, it has three stages, chamfered rusticated quoins, a clock face on the south side, a corbelled moulded cornice, and a parapet with urns. It contains a west doorway with a Gibbs surround, now blocked and a mullioned window inserted.	II*
Group of three chest tombs 52.62087°N 2.84346°W	—	1790	The chest tombs are in the churchyard of St Edith's Church, and are dated respectively 1790, 1799 and 1809. They are rectangular, and each has a moulded plinth and capping. On the west face of each tomb is an inscription panel.	II
Outbuilding west of Lower House; 52.62073°N 2.84273°W	—	Late 18th or early 19th century (probable)	Originally a malthouse, later used for other purposes, it is in limestone with a tile roof. There are three levels, a door on the west side, and ventilated openings on each side.	II
Urn-shaped memorial 52.62095°N 2.84342°W	—	c. 1805	A tomb in the churchyard of St Edith's Church, it is in limestone. The tomb consists of a large urn on a circular moulded pedestal with a cast iron bracket for a former finial on the top.	II
Castle House; 52.61546°N 2.85304°W	—	Early 19th century (probable)	A farmhouse, later a private house, it is in brick with a slate roof. There is an L-shaped plan, with a front range, and a lower range at the rear on the left. The house has two storeys and an attic, and a front of three bays. In the centre is a doorway with a fanlight and a pediment. The outer bays contain full-height round-headed recesses, and the windows are sashes with segmental heads.	II
Churton House; 52.62076°N 2.84365°W	—	Early 19th century	A brick house with a modillioned eaves cornice, and a slate roof, hipped at the front and twin-gabled at the rear. There are two storeys and three bays. The central doorway has a projecting Tuscan porch, above the door is a fanlight, and the windows are sashes.	II
Old Rectory; 52.62171°N 2.83956°W	—	Early 19th century	A rectory, later a private house, it is in red brick with a slate roof. There are two storeys, a T-shaped plan, and a front of three bays. In the centre is a porch with a hipped roof, and the windows are sashes.	II
Churton Lodge; 52.62131°N 2.84270°W	—	c. 1830	The house was extended later n the century. It is in rendered brick with slate roofs. There are two storeys, the original part has three bays, and there is an extension to the left and a recessed extension to the right. In the original part the outer bays contain full-height canted bay windows, and in the centre is a porch. The windows are sashes.	II
Home Farmhouse; 52.61583°N 2.85203°W	—	Mid 19th century	A red brick farmhouse with a tile roof. There are two storeys, three bays, and a lower range at the rear on the left. The central doorway has a rectangular fanlight, and the windows are sashes.	II
