= Stradey Castle =

Mansion in Llanelli, Wales

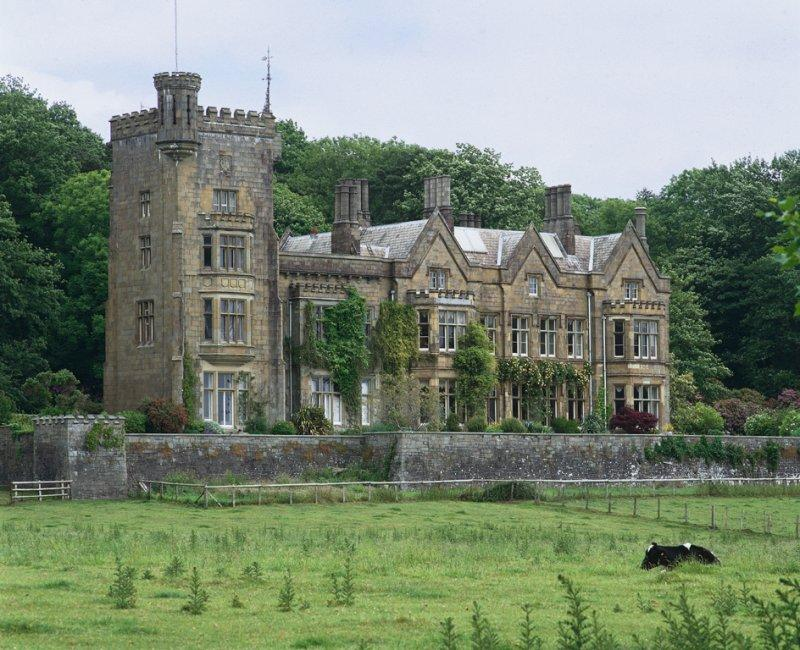
- Stradey Castle and gardens from the north-western site
- Interactive map of the Stradey Castle area

General information
- Location: Carmarthenshire, Cwmbach Road, Llanelli, Llanelli, Wales
- Coordinates: 51.6922°N 4.1843°W
- Elevation: 26.8 metres (87.9 feet)
- Year built: c. 1850–1855
- Owner: Patrick and Claire Mansel Lewis

Design and construction
- Designations: Grade II*

Stradey Castle is a mansion in Llanelli, Carmarthenshire, Wales. The mansion was built from the years 1850–1855 after the demolition of a house 350 metres south-west of the current site. The building was designed by Edward Haycock for David Mansel Lewis. In 1873–1874, a wing was added to the mansion by John Chessell Buckler, remaining virtually unchanged since.

== History ==
Parts of Heidi, a 2005 live-action film, were shot at Stradey Castle. The Doctor Who 2011 Christmas special, The Doctor, the Widow and the Wardrobe filmed scenes here in September and October 2011.

In 2016 Stradey Castle experienced a fire that was caused by, as recounted by Claire Mansel Lewis, one of the owners of Stradey Castle, "The sun's rays being reflected by the magnifying mirror on my dressing table onto the curtains" she continued, "Half an hour later, and the house would have been destroyed."

== Building ==
The front entrance of Stradey Castle is at the north side of the building, with the garden being located to the east side of the building. On the entrance side of the building is the hall and the library, both of which were altered in 1874. To the garden side of the building is a suite of rooms, including the reception rooms.

The wing, constructed from 1873 to 1874, contains a large room with a skylight, a billiard room, 2 bedrooms, a large marble bath and a turret at the top of the tower.

== See also ==
- Grade II* listed buildings in Wales
- Grade II* listed buildings in Carmarthenshire
