= Church of St Michael and All Angels, Aberystwyth =

Church in Ceredigion, Wales

Coordinates: 52.4141°N 4.0883°W

St Michael's Church
- Parish Church of St Michael and All Angels
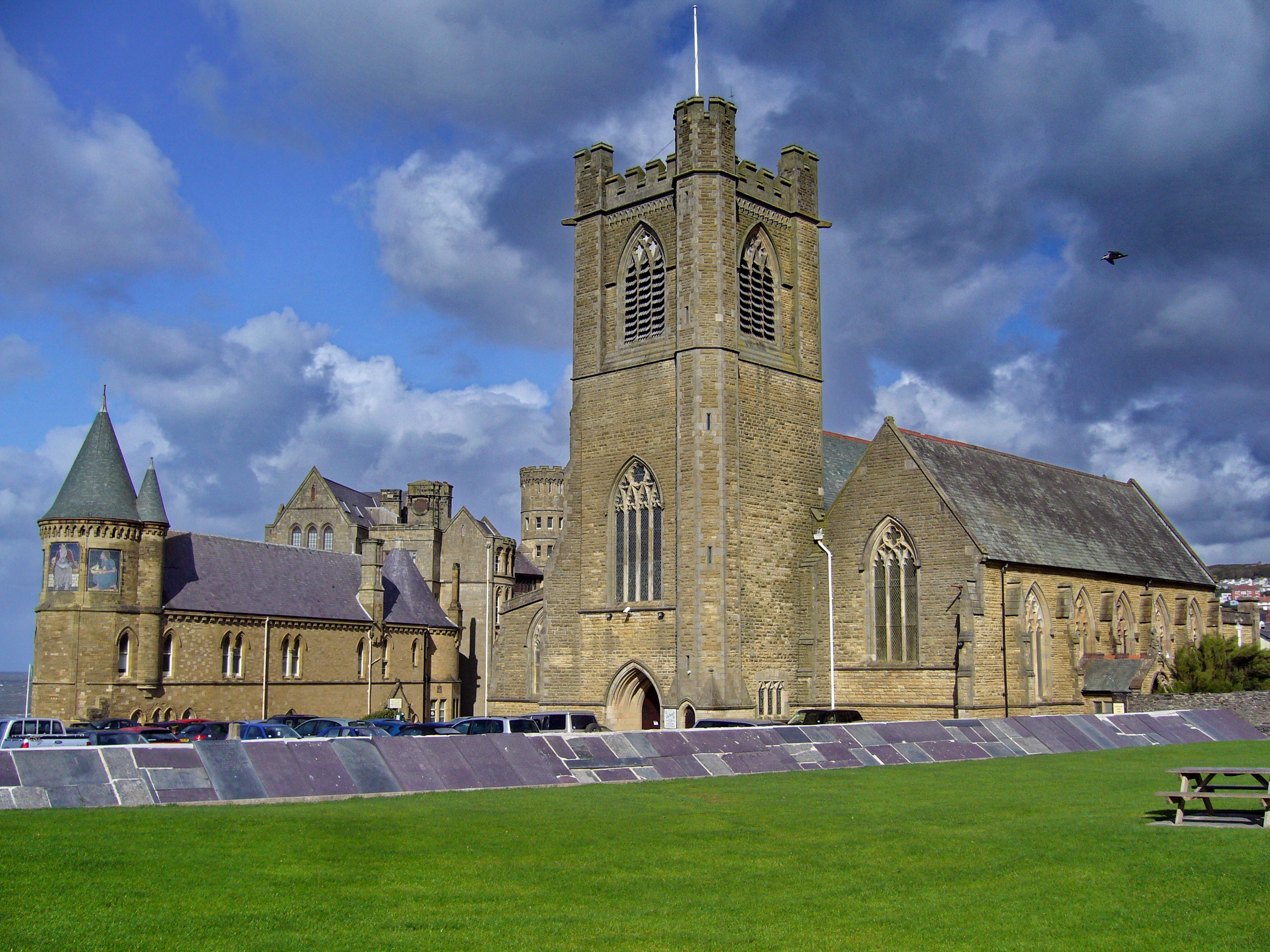
- St Michael's with the Old College to the left

- Location in Ceredigion
- Location: Aberystwyth, Ceredigion
- Country: Wales
- Denomination: Church in Wales
- Website: St Michael's Church

Architecture
- Functional status: Active
- Heritage designation: Grade II
- Designated: 27 July 1961
- Architectural type: Church
- Style: Gothic Revival
- Completed: 1890

Specifications
- Materials: Body of church: rubble Roof: slate

St Michael's Church is a parish church in the town of Aberystwyth, Ceredigion, Wales. St Michael's is the fourth church to stand on the site. The first dated from the 15th century but was in ruins by the mid-18th century. Its replacement only stood for some forty years before itself being replaced in 1829-1833 with a church designed by Edward Haycock Sr. of Shrewsbury. Nothing of the two earlier buildings remains. The Haycock church was itself superseded by the present church, built by Nicholson & Son of Hereford in 1886-1890. A fragment of the Haycock church remains to the west of the current building.

St Michael's is an active parish church in the Diocese of St Davids. At the end of the 20th century it claimed the largest Anglican congregation in Wales. It is designated by Cadw as a Grade II listed building.

== History ==
The town of Aberystwyth developed around the Norman castle. Four churches have stood on the site. In the 15th century a church dedicated to St Mary was constructed between the castle and the sea. This church, in ruins by 1748, and its short-lived successor, were replaced by a third church constructed in 1829-1833 by Edward Haycock Sr. Haycock was commissioned by William Edward Powell. (Note: Haycock also undertook work for Powell at his country house, Nanteos,) a local landowner and Conservative politician who served as Member of Parliament (MP) for Cardiganshire from 1816 until shortly before he died in 1854. Powell was made High Sheriff in 1810 and Lord Lieutenant of Cardiganshire in 1817. He lived at Nanteos and developed much of Aberystwyth in the 1820s; including Laura Place which fronts the present church.

By the later 19th century, the accelerating development of Aberystwyth as a seaside resort brought calls for a larger, and more impressive church. A later William Powell donated further land at Laura Place for the building of a new church in the 1880s. Powell commissioned designs for the new structure from Nicholson & Son of Hereford and the present church was built between 1886-1890. (Note: Material relating to the construction and destruction of the churches on the Laura Place site is held in the National Archive.) The west vestry is all that remains of Haycock's church, This fragment is a Grade II listed building. (Note: An oil painting of 1850 by an unknown artist depicting Edward Haycock Sr.'s church is held in the Ceredigion Museum.)

The Cambrian News and Merionethshire Standard celebrated the opening of the new church on 3 October 1890, congratulating "all those who desire to see the town beautified, or who think that a building devoted to the highest purpose should be of the best that human beings can devise and reasonably provide". Further work was carried out on the development of the church in the first half of the 20th century. Major repairs were undertaken to the church roof in the 21st century, following storm damage from Cyclone Dirk.

St Michael's remains an active parish church in the Evangelical tradition. Services are regularly held. In the late 20th/early 21st centuries, the church claimed the largest Anglican congregation in Wales. The church is administered by the Archdeaconry of Cardigan within the Diocese of St Davids.

== Architecture ==
The "large and prosperous church" is built on a three-nave plan, with a vestry and a West tower. A planned spire was never built. The construction materials are York sandstone rubble and Westmoreland slate roofs. The style is Gothic Revival, drawing on English Decorated Gothic. Thomas Lloyd, Julian Orbach and Robert Scourfield, in their Carmarthenshire and Ceredigion volume in the Pevsner Buildings of Wales series, consider it "old-fashioned", even at the time of its construction.

The interior is faced with Bath limestone and decorated with banding in a contrasting red sandstone. It contains a chancel rood screen by W. D. Caröe dating from the early 20th century. Carved panels in a memorial chapel at the front of the church commemorate the dead of Aberystwyth from the First and Second World Wars. The chapel was constructed in 1992 and involved the moving of the rood screen. (Note: The graveyard at St Michael's contains an unusual 19th century funerary headstone in the shape of a medicine bottle. It commemorates an Aberystwyth doctor, David Evans, who died in 1861.) The stained glass is mainly by Alfred Hemming, (Note: Alfred Octavius Hemming worked with Clayton and Bell before establishing his own, highly successful, firm in 1883.) although the East window is the work of Heaton, Butler and Bayne. St Michael's is a Grade II listed building.

== Gallery ==
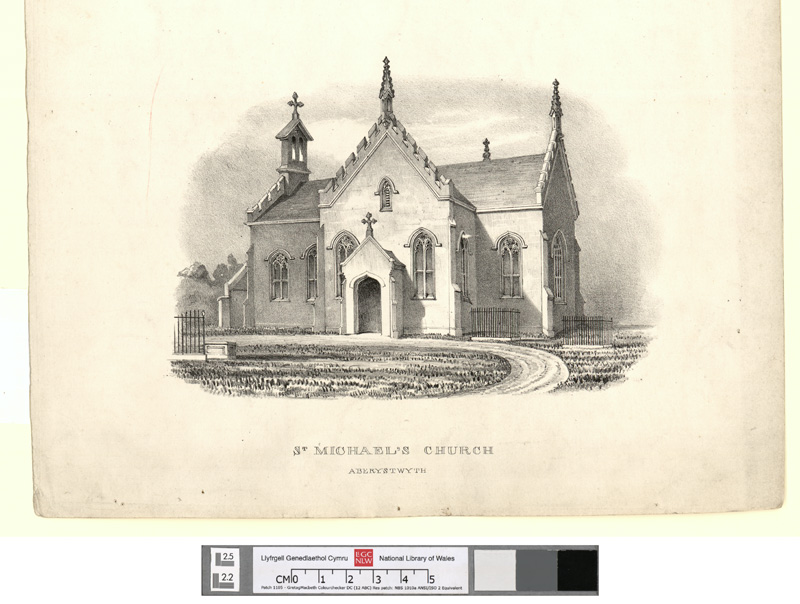
A print c. 1850 showing Haycock's early 19th-century church in a Strawberry Hill Gothick style

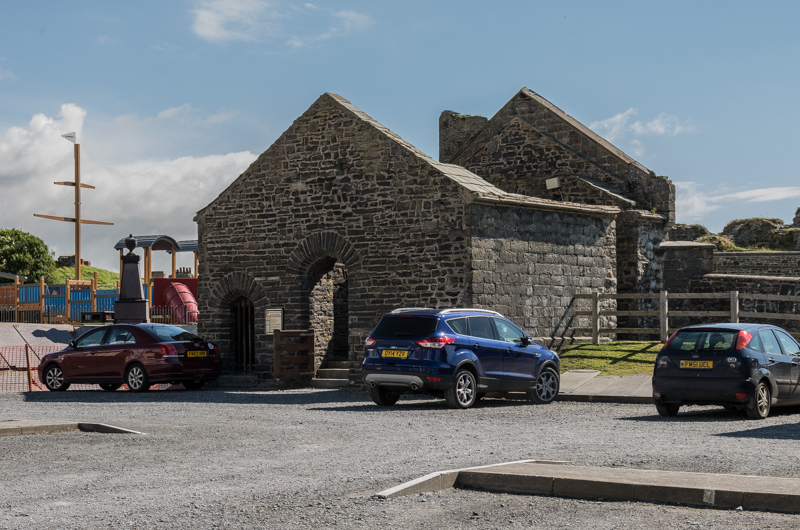
The vestry, the only remnant of Haycock's church

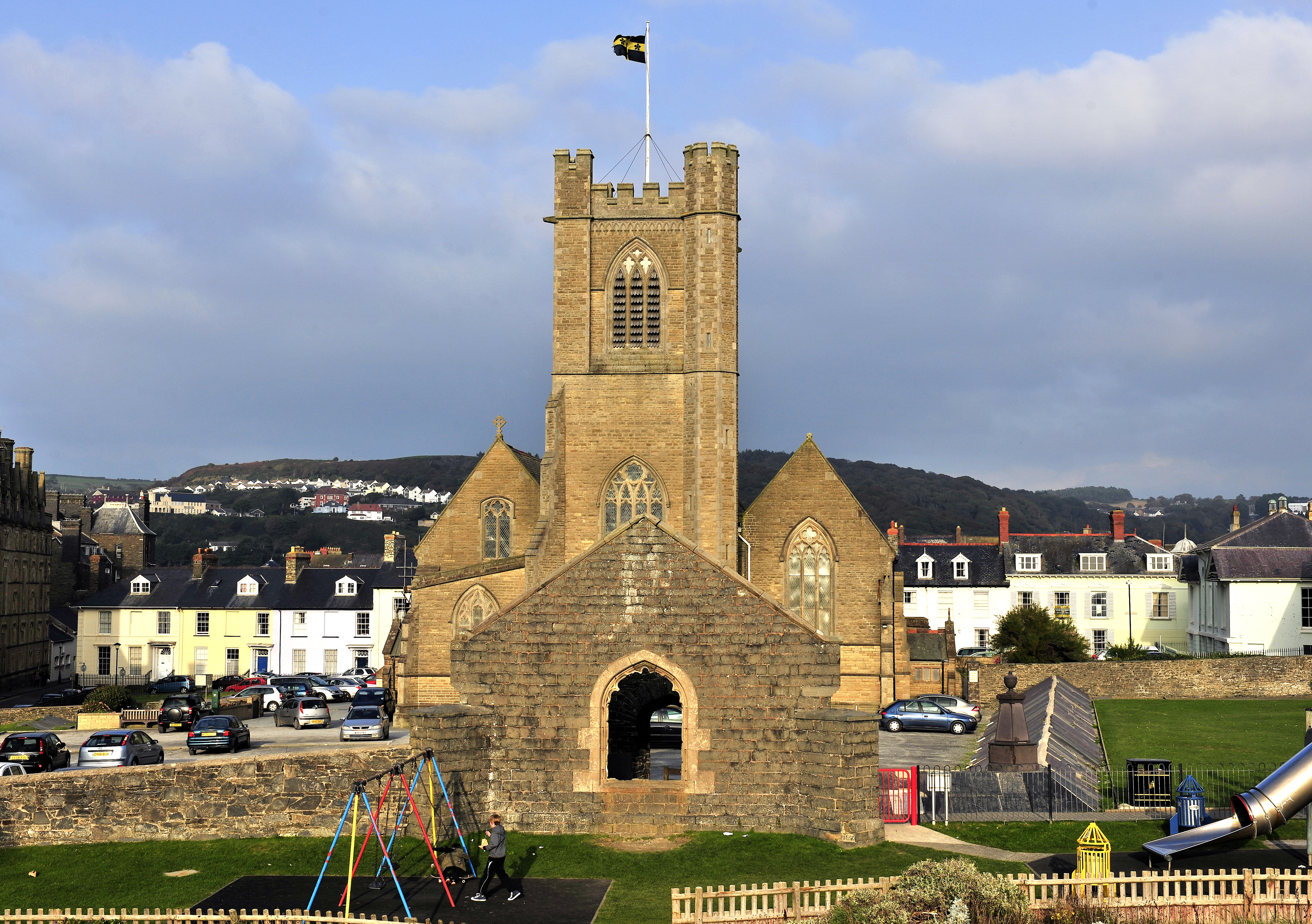
The church, with Laura Place behind

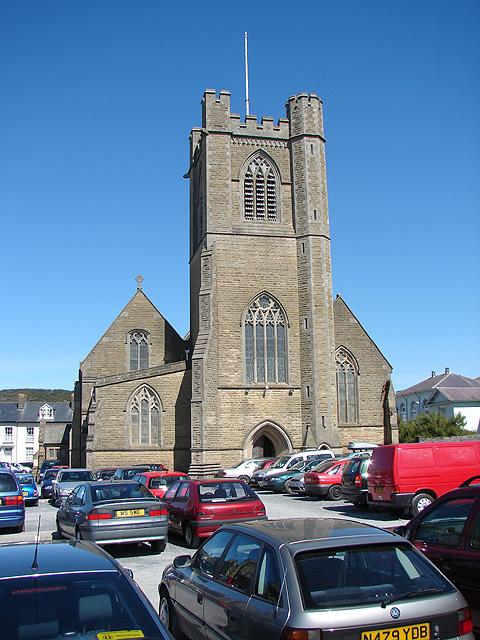
A spire, intended to cap the tower, was never built

== Sources ==
- Aberystwyth: Understanding Urban Character (PDF). Cardiff: Cadw. 2013. ISBN 978-1-857-60304-0.
- Colvin, Howard (1978) [1956]. A Biographical Dictionary of British Architects 1600–1840. London: John Murray. ISBN 978-0-719-53328-0.
- "Powell family of Nanteos". Dictionary of Welsh Biography. National Library of Wales.
- Dyer, Matthew (2021). St Michael and All Angels' Church, Aberystwyth - Heritage Impact Assessment. Bristol: Austin, Smith, Lord.
- Lloyd, Thomas; Orbach, Julian; Scourfield, Robert (2006). Carmarthenshire and Ceredigion. The Buildings of Wales. New Haven, US and London: Yale University Press. ISBN 978-0-300-10179-9.
- Malaws, B.A. (2006). "St Michael and All Angels' Church, Aberystwyth (110278)". Coflein. RCAHMW.
- "St Michael's Church, Aberystwyth (96222)". Coflein. RCAHMW. 2014.
- "Church of St Michael, Aberystwyth". discovery.nationalarchives.gov.uk. The National Archives.
- "Aberystwyth, St Michael". National Churches Trust.
