= Groes, Port Talbot =

Former village in the county of Glamorgan, Wales

Coordinates: 51.5686°N 3.7463°W

Groes was a village south of Port Talbot in the county of Glamorgan, Wales. It was demolished in 1976 to make way for Junction 39 of the new M4 motorway.

The village was built in the 1830s, designed by the architect Edward Haycock. It included the octagonal Beulah Calvinistic Methodist Chapel (built in 1838) and later a school (built in 1860); the school was paid for by Christopher Rice Mansel Talbot, then owner of Margam Castle.

Despite Port Talbot Council's deputy engineer proposing an alternative route for the M4 motorway, in 1974 it was confirmed the village would be destroyed. The village's 21 families were rehoused and the houses and school were demolished in 1976. A new school had been built in nearby Margam in 1973, while the Beulah Chapel was dismantled and rebuilt in the nearby Tollgate Park.
