= Laura Place, Aberystwyth =

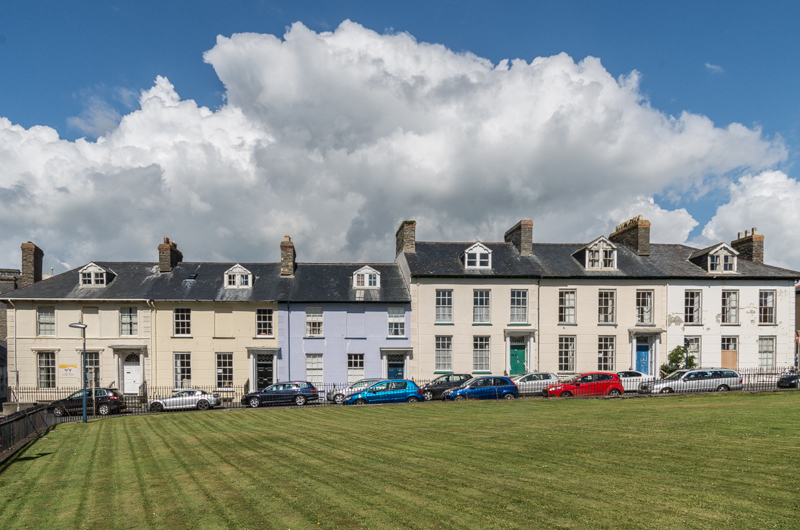
- "The finest Georgian houses of the town"

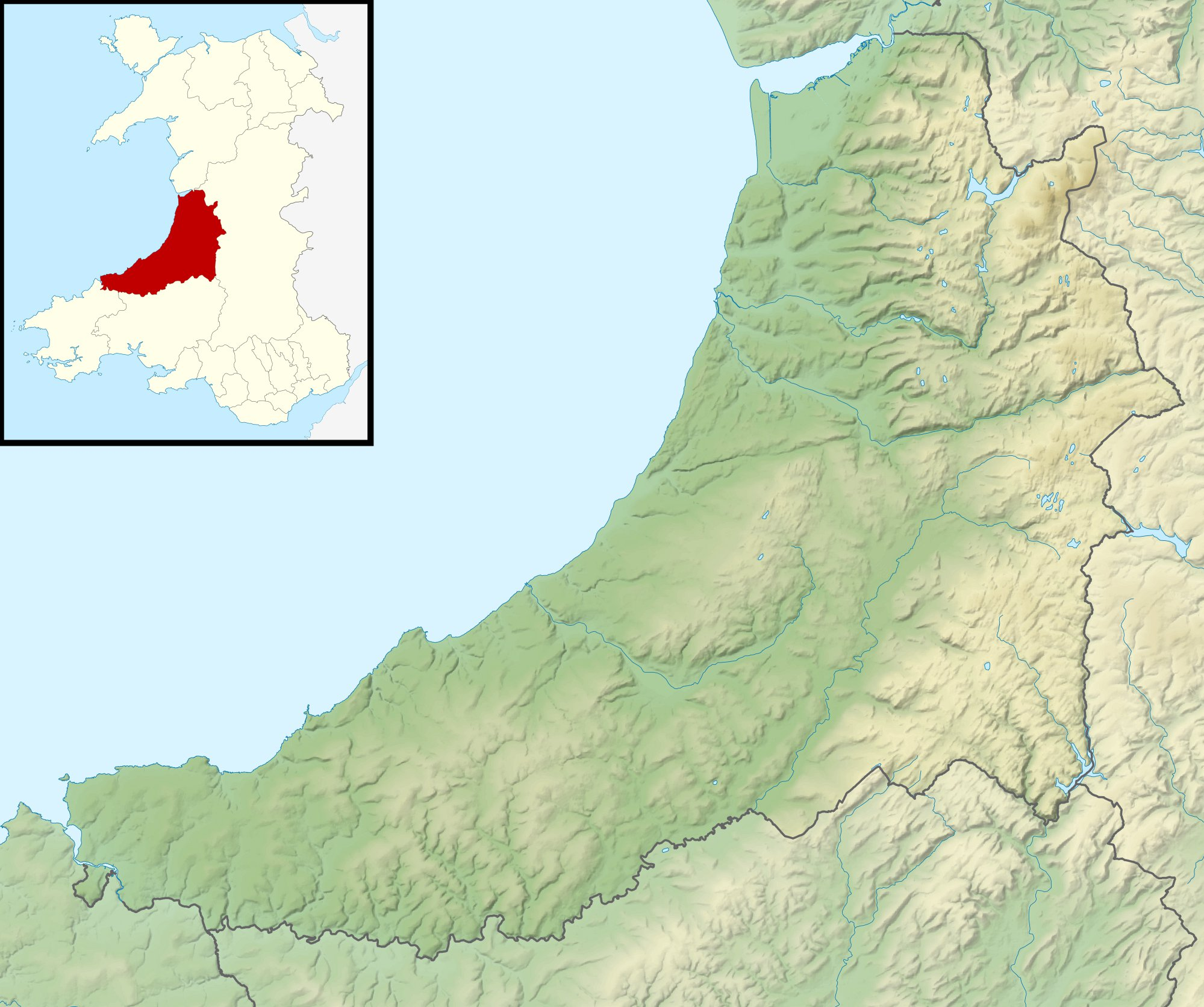
- Location within Ceredigion
- 52.4148°N 4.0879°W
- Type: Terrace
- Location: Aberystwyth, Ceredigion, Wales

History
- Built: c.1810-1830

Site notes
- Architectural style: Regency
- Governing body: Privately owned

Listed Building – Grade II*
- Official name: 1-9, 11 and 12 Laura Place, Assembly Rooms
- Designated: 27 July 1961
- Reference no.: 10257

Laura Place, in the centre of Aberystwyth, Ceredigion, Wales is a terrace of mid-19th century townhouses. Pevsner considers them "the finest Georgian houses of the town". Laura Place forms two sides of a square, fronting the Church of St Michael and All Angels in the shadow of Aberystwyth Castle. It was developed in the early 19th century by William Edward Powell of Nanteos, High Sheriff and Lord Lieutenant of Cardiganshire. Powell's architect is uncertain, but Cadw suggests George Stanley Repton as a possibility. Repton was certainly the architect of the Assembly Rooms, a separate building standing between 1-9 and 11-12.

The Assembly Rooms later became the first home of the National Library of Wales. The Place was named after Powell's first wife, Laura Edwyna Phelp, who died in 1822. No.s 1-9 inclusive, and No.s 11 and 12 Laura Place are Grade II* listed buildings. The Assembly Rooms are also Grade II*.

== History ==
William Edward Powell was a landowner and Conservative politician who served as the Member of Parliament (MP) for Cardiganshire from 1816 until shortly before his death in 1854. He was made High Sheriff in 1810 and Lord Lieutenant of Cardiganshire in 1817. He lived at Nanteos and developed Laura Place in the 1820s; No. 11 being the Powell townhouse in Aberystwyth and No. 12 serving as the estate office. The remainder was speculative building development. Powell engaged George Stanley Repton to design the Assembly Rooms, intended as a gathering place for the fashionable visitors to Regency Aberystwyth. (Note: The Royal Institute of British Architects library holds an exterior design and plan for the building dated 1829.) The town was developed throughout the 19th century as a seaside resort, and was publicised as the "Brighton of Wales". Cadw suggest that Repton may also have undertaken the design of other buildings in Laura Place, for example No.s 5 and 6. The development was named in honour of Powell's first wife, Laura Edwyna, who died in 1822.

The Assembly Rooms subsequently served as the first, temporary, home of the National Library of Wales, and now is part of the Music Department of Aberystwyth University. The majority of the other buildings in Laura Place remain private residences, although many have been sub-divided into flats. Some of the houses were part of the university estate, but most have been sold in the last ten years.

== Architecture and description ==
Thomas Lloyd, Julian Orbach and Robert Scourfield, in their Carmarthenshire and Ceredigion volume in the Pevsner Buildings of Wales series, describe Laura Place as comprising "the finest Georgian houses of the town." Cadw considers it a "striking and unusual example of sophisticated urban Georgian building". The houses are of two storeys, with attics and basements, and with roofs of Welsh slate. The two rows face the Church of St Michael and All Angels. The original church was designed for William Powell by Edward Haycock Sr., who also undertook work at Nanteos. (Note: The current church was built between 1889-1890, a development that saw the demolition of Haycock's earlier structure.) No.s 1-9, and No.s 11 and 12 Laura Place are each separately designated by Cadw, the statutory body with responsibility for the listing of buildings in Wales, as a Grade II* listed building. The Assembly Rooms are also listed at Grade II*. This is the second-highest grade and indicates "particularly important buildings of more than special interest".

== Sources ==
- Cadw (2013). Aberystwyth: Understanding Urban Character (PDF). Cardiff: Cadw. ISBN 978-1-857-60304-0.
- Colvin, Howard (1978) [1956]. A Biographical Dictionary of British Architects 1600–1840. London: John Murray. ISBN 978-0-719-53328-0.
- Lloyd, Thomas; Orbach, Julian; Scourfield, Robert (2006). Carmarthenshire and Ceredigion. The Buildings of Wales. New Haven, US and London: Yale University Press. ISBN 978-0-300-10179-9.
