= Church Pulverbatch =

Hamlet and civil parish in Shropshire, England

Coordinates: 52.620°N 2.845°W

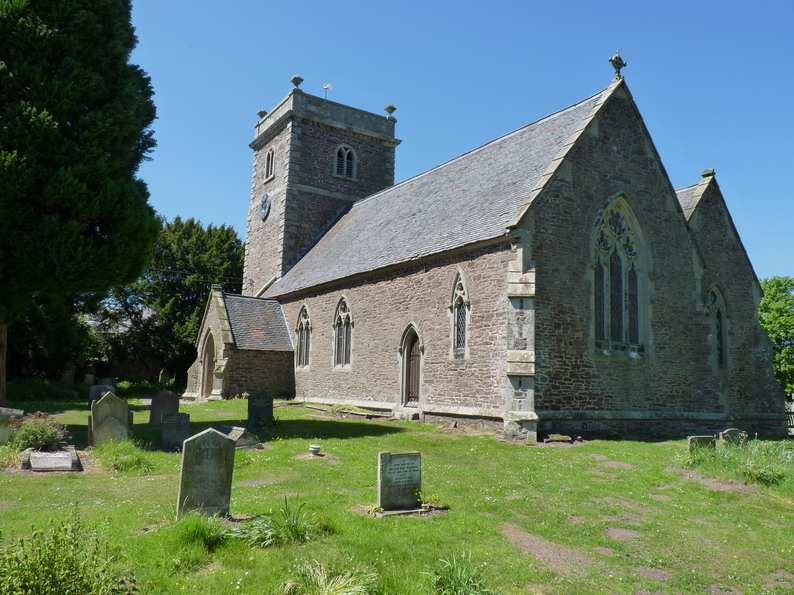
- St Edith's Church, Church Pulverbatch

- Location within Shropshire
- Population: 361 (2011)
- OS grid reference: SJ428028
- Civil parish: Church Pulverbatch
- Unitary authority: Shropshire
- Ceremonial county: Shropshire
- Region: West Midlands
- Country: England
- Sovereign state: United Kingdom
- Post town: SHREWSBURY
- Postcode district: SY5
- Dialling code: 01743
- Police: West Mercia
- Fire: Shropshire
- Ambulance: West Midlands
- UK Parliament: South Shropshire

Church Pulverbatch is a small village and civil parish in central Shropshire, England. The population of the parish was 344 at the time of the 2001 census, increasing to 361 at the 2011 Census.

It is located near the villages of Habberley and Picklescott. The nearest towns are Shrewsbury and Church Stretton; both are approximately 8 miles by road.

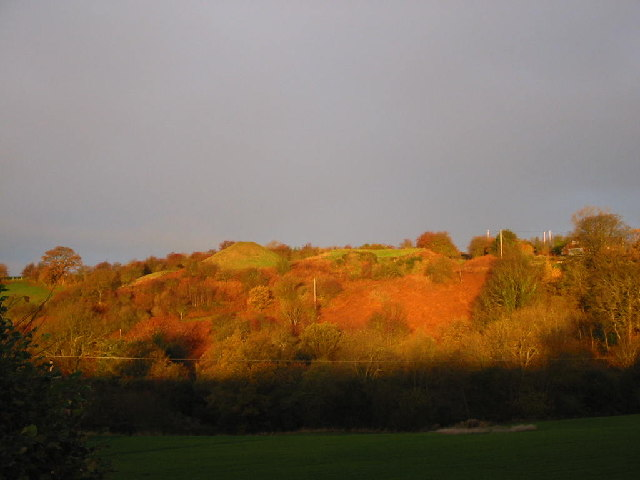
Castle Pulverbatch

Also within the parish is the village of Pulverbatch, which is situated on the Shrewsbury-Longden-Bridges road and has a public house, called the White Horse. The villages of Church Pulverbatch (also known as Churton) and Pulverbatch are less than half a mile apart. The hamlet of Wrentnall is situated to the north of Pulverbatch, also within the parish. The current Lord of Wrentnall, and Lord of Great Lyth, is also the Baron of Pulverbatch (Farrow, M. W. MA (Cantab), 7 April 2003, Lordships of Wrentnall and Pulverbatch).

The Church of England parish church of St Edith, built of mauve rubblestone with Grinshill stone dressings, has an ornate west tower of 1773, but most of the present building, the nave and chancel, was restored in 1852-53 and a north aisle added by Shrewsbury architect Edward Haycock. Inside is a plain wooden west gallery and box pews, besides a framed Roll of Honour to parish men who served in World War I, and electric lighting that was fitted in memory of five men of the parish who died serving in World War II. The churchyard contains a Commonwealth war grave of a Canadian airman of World War II.

On a hill to the south of Pulverbatch are the earthwork remains of Castle Pulverbatch, a medieval motte-and-bailey castle.

== See also ==
- Listed buildings in Church Pulverbatch
