= Grade II* listed buildings in Wales =

Grade II* listed buildings in Wales by county:

- Anglesey
- Blaenau Gwent
- Bridgend
- Caerphilly
- Cardiff
- Carmarthenshire
- Ceredigion
- Conwy
- Denbighshire
- Flintshire
- Gwynedd
- Merthyr Tydfil
- Monmouthshire
- Neath Port Talbot
- Newport
- Pembrokeshire
- Powys
- Rhondda Cynon Taf
- Swansea
- Torfaen
- Vale of Glamorgan
- Wrexham
