= St David's Church, Llanddewi Brefi =

Church in Ceredigion, Wales

Coordinates: 52.1798°N 3.9556°W

St David's Church is a Grade II* listed medieval church in the Welsh village of Llanddewi Brefi, 3 miles south of Tregaron in the county of Ceredigion.

== History ==
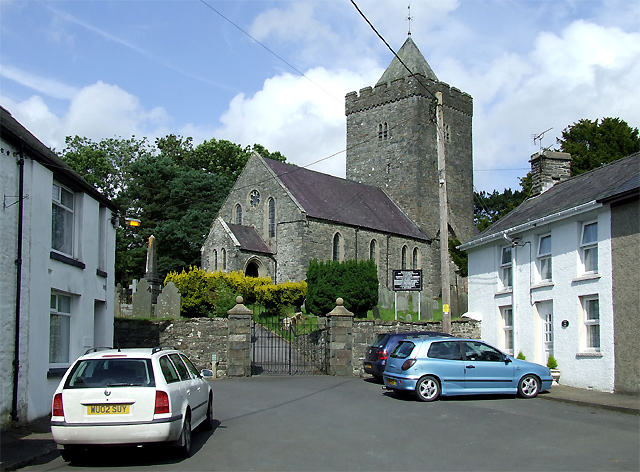
The Church of St David, Llanddewi Brefi.

The church was founded in 1187, built on the site where a famous synod was held in the sixth century. According to local legend, it is said that during this synod, which St David addressed, the flat ground rose into a mound beneath his feet, allowing him to be better seen and heard by the vast crowd that had gathered to hear him speak. The church supposedly stands on that same mound. It's possible that, in reality, it was built on the site of a Bronze Age barrow.

The earliest Welsh translation of Rhygyfarch's "Life of St, David", Llyf Ancr Llanddewi Brefi, was written here in 1346 by an Anchorite, and is now kept in the Bodleian Library at Oxford.

The central tower dates from the 12th century, which, in medieval times, had five bells in its belfry. Today there is only one bell, which was given to the church by John Inglis Jones of Derry Ormond in 1874. The 12th century nave and chancel were taken down in 1832, being beyond repair, and replaced for the sum of £285 in 1833–34. The new building was of poor quality, however, and the nave as it stands today was rebuilt for £1,100 in 1874, and the Chancel in 1886 for £530.

== Contents ==
The church contains a number of items of historical significance, including inscribed stones from the early medieval period.

=== Inscribed Stones ===
The various inscribed stones in the Church were found close by and have been moved within the Church. They are thought to be Early Medieval grave markers.

1) An Ogham inscribed stone which stands in the tower, that was perhaps the tombstone of a Pelagian Christian.

2) The Idnert Stone. Only two-fifths exists today built into the Church wall, as 19th century masons broke it up to use as building material when repairing the nave's west wall. Two innacsessible frangments are visible high up on the outside of the nave NW angle. Fortunately, Edward Lluyd, having seen the Idnert Stone in 1698, made a copy of it, which reads:

"hic iacet idnert filivs iacobi qui occisvs fvit propter predam sancti david"
["Here lies Idnert son of Jacobus who was slain because of the plunder of the Sanctuary of David"]

3) The Dallus Stone, probably of 6th century date and inscribed with vertical text on one face, 'DALLVS DUMELVS' which is presumed to be the name of a male person whose grave it marked. In 1746 it was noted as being used as part of a stile to the east of the church, and had been moved into the Church by 1964. It is now cemented onto the floor, whereas it would have been a pillar stone, some 43 inches (110 cm) high.

4) The Cenlisini Stone, is a 69 inches (180 cm) tall pillar stone, with the Latin inscription 'CENLISINIBT~DS~', which would expand to CENLISINI BENEDICAT DEUS (Translation: (The Cross) of Cenlisini. May God bless him.). It dates to the 7th-9th century and originally stood in what is now the churchyard, where it was noted in 1695, and is now cemented into the floor inside the Church.

An Ox horn was kept in the Chancel for several centuries, the remains of which are now kept at the Welsh Folk Museum, St Fagans. There are two traditions linked to the horn, the first of which is told in the following Welsh verse:

"Llanddewi Brefi fraith,
Lle brefodd yr ŷch naw gwaith
Nes hollti Craif y Foelallt."
["Mottled-hued Llanddewi Brefi,
Where the ox lowed nine times,
Splitting open Foelallt's rock."]

The story goes that one of two oxen employed to carry stones to build the church died from being overworked, at which point the other bellowed nine times, its cries so loud and mournful that Foelallt Hill was consequently split open. The second tradition claims the horn came from a monster, "the plague of the country", which was vanquished by St David.

In the 1850s The travel writer George Borrow records that "Horns of enormous size" had been preserved for many generations in the church. Borrow writes that the church Sexton informed him that these relics had "dwindled away" but that "one very old man who is buried here did tell me shortly before he died that he had seen one very old man who had seen of them one little tip." The Sexton then showed Borrow the commemoration tablet of Thomas Jones (died February the sixth 1830, aged 92) who he said was the man he had spoken with.
