= Beulah Calvinistic Methodist Chapel =

Coordinates: 51.5725°N 3.7564°W

Beulah Calvinistic Methodist Church
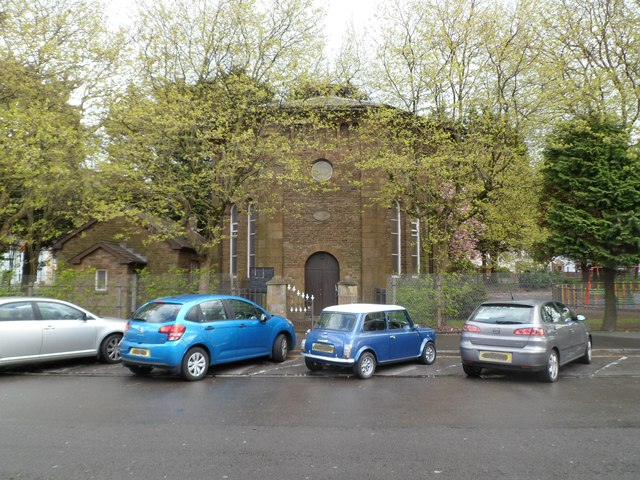
- Beulah Chapel in its present location
- Beulah Calvinistic Methodist Church
- Denomination: Presbyterian Church of Wales

Beulah Calvinistic Methodist Chapel, also known locally as "The Round Chapel" and in Welsh as "Capel y Groes", is a Grade II*-listed building in Margam, Port Talbot, Wales. It originally built in the mid-nineteenth century and had to be dismantled and moved in 1974 to make way for the new M4 motorway.

== History ==
The Romanesque-style chapel was constructed as part of the "planned village" of Groes, created by architect Edward Haycock, Sr. The chapel's design was approved by local landowner C. R. M. Talbot, and is possibly based on the Chapter House at Margam Park. It was built by Thomas Jenkin in 1838 at the cost of £800 using material from the estate.

In 1974, the government decided to demolish the village to make room for the new M4 motorway. The chapel was the only building in the village to be saved; it was re-located in 1975–76 to Tollgate Park, a short distance away, where it still stands. It was Grade II*-listed on 9 January 1976 "as the only surviving octagonal chapel in Wales, and a special example of the round-arched style in chapel architecture."

== Description ==
The octagonal chapel is Romanesque in style with coursed sandstone walls and a hipped slate roof. The walls have ashlar pilasters that rise to a pronounced Lombard cornice with false machicolations. The eaves of the roof project out over the walls and the roof is topped by a bell cupola with a tall finial. There is a small entrance bay with a tiled floor. The gallery is supported by two cast-iron columns with ringed capitals and has a straight wood-panelled front with five tiers of pews
