= Portland Place, Aberaeron =

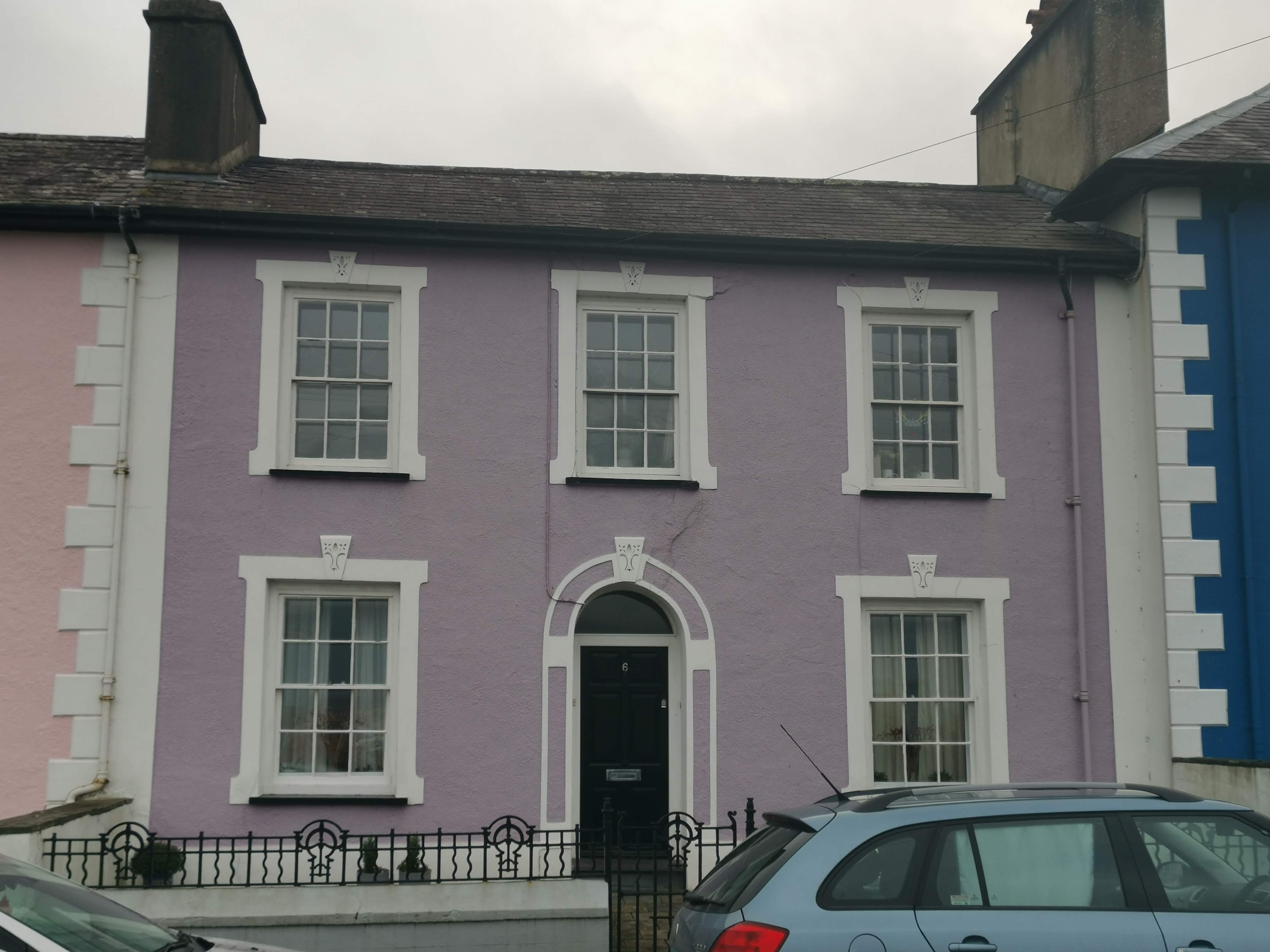
- "The finest single terrace" in Aberaeron

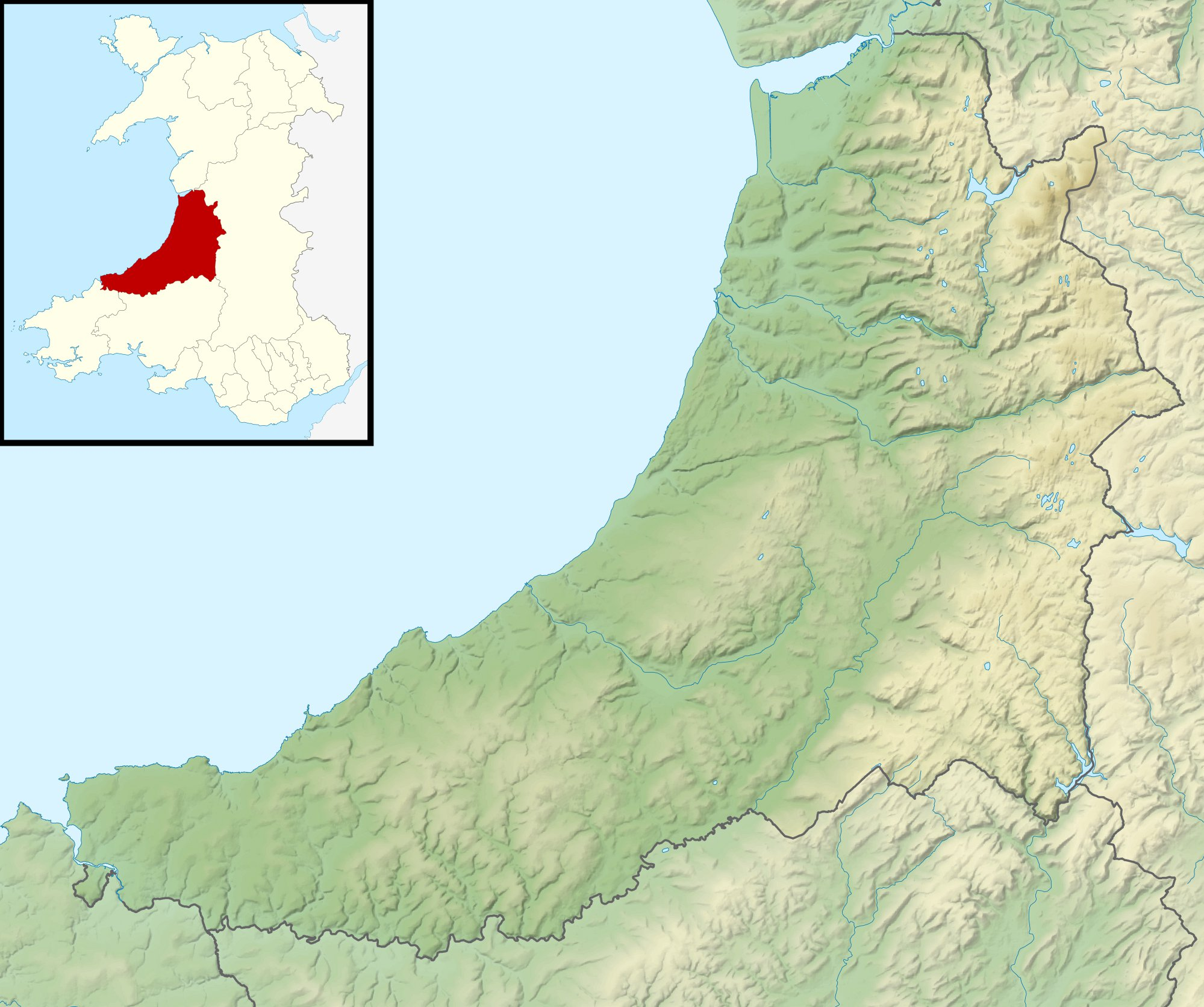
- Location within Ceredigion
- 52.2418°N 4.26°W
- Type: Terrace
- Location: Aberaeron, Ceredigion, Wales

History
- Built: c.1830

Site notes
- Architect: Edward Haycock Sr. - overall plan
- Architectural style: Regency
- Governing body: Privately owned

Listed Building – Grade II*
- Official name: 1-7 Portland Place
- Designated: 28 September 1961
- Reference no.: 10080

Portland Place, in the centre of Aberaeron, Ceredigion, Wales is a terrace of mid-19th century townhouses. The town of Aberaeron was developed around 1810 as a port by the Rev. Alban Thomas Jones Gwynne, a local landowner. After his father's death in 1819, Colonel A.T.J. Gwynne engaged Edward Haycock Sr. to plan a major expansion. Leases were sold in the early 1830s and development continued for much of the rest of the 19th century, the town growing as a centre for shipbuilding and commerce. The expansion of the railways, and their arrival in Aberaeron in 1909 brought these commercial endeavours to an end and the town became a seaside resort and a centre for local government. No.s 1-7 inclusive on Portland Place are Grade II* listed buildings, forming "the finest single terrace" in Aberaeron.

== History ==
Aberaeron is a relatively unusual example in Wales of a planned settlement. The town was developed in the very early 19th century by the Rev. Alban Thomas Jones Gwynne. Gwynne had amassed a large local landholding in the area through marriage and in 1807 obtained permission for the development of a port by Act of Parliament. Although work on the harbour proceeded swiftly, the construction of the intended residential areas behind it progressed more slowly. By 1819 Gywnne was dead, and no further work was undertaken during the time of his widow. Her death in 1830 saw their son, Colonel A.T.J. Gwynne, reinvigorate activities and in that year he engaged Edward Haycock Sr. to draw up plans. (Note: A lease dating from the early 1830s references "Mr Haycock's plan".) Haycock, son of an architect, lived most of his life in Shrewsbury and developed an extensive practice in Shropshire, the Welsh Borders and South Wales. Haycock worked out a grid plan development and leases on plots were sold from the 1830s onwards. Portland Place was a later development, of the 1850s. An inscription on No. 1, Portland House, dates it to 1855 and credits Benjamin Evans as the architect. The development of the town continued as a centre for trade and shipbuilding throughout the 19th century, but declined in the early 20th century with the arrival in the area of the railways. By the 21st century, Aberaeron's economy had refocussed on tourism and local government. The town is now the site of Neuadd Cyngor Ceredigion (English: Ceredigion Council Hall) at Penmorfa, the headquarters of Ceredigion County Council.

== Architecture and description ==
No.s 1-7 form a continuous terrace to the south-west of the bridge which crosses the River Aeron. Thomas Lloyd, Julian Orbach and Robert Scourfield, in their Carmarthenshire and Ceredigion volume in the Pevsner Buildings of Wales series, describe Portland Place as "the finest single terrace" in Aberaeron. The houses are built to a "simple" Regency design. Nos. 1 and 7, the terminating blocks, are of three storeys, the remainder of two. The roofs are of Welsh slate. The houses were painted in varying pastel colours in the 20th century. While Lloyd, Orbach and Scourfield do not think this represents an "authentic restoration", they acknowledge that the present appearance "entertains".

The Cadw listing record for Portland Place describes it as "a particularly well-preserved terrace". No.s 1-7 are each separately designated by Cadw, the statutory body with responsibility for the listing of buildings in Wales, as a Grade II* listed building. This is the second-highest grade and indicates "particularly important buildings of more than special interest".

== Sources ==
- Colvin, Howard (1978) [1956]. A Biographical Dictionary of British Architects 1600–1840. London: John Murray. ISBN 978-0-719-53328-0.
- Lloyd, Thomas; Orbach, Julian; Scourfield, Robert (2006). Carmarthenshire and Ceredigion. The Buildings of Wales. New Haven, US and London: Yale University Press. ISBN 978-0-300-10179-9.
