= Treforgan =

Farm in Ceredigion, Wales

Coordinates: 52.083754°N 4.626539°W

- Location within Ceredigion
- OS grid reference: SN 2013 4608
  - Cardiff: 74.7 mi (120.2 km)
  - London: 196.3 mi (315.9 km)
- Community: Llangoedmor
- Principal area: Ceredigion
- Country: Wales
- Sovereign state: United Kingdom
- Post town: Cardigan
- Postcode district: SA43
- Police: Dyfed-Powys
- Fire: Mid and West Wales
- Ambulance: Welsh
- UK Parliament: Ceredigion Preseli
- Senedd Cymru – Welsh Parliament: Ceredigion

Treforgan is a Grade II* listed farmhouse and farm in the village and community of Llangoedmor, Ceredigion, Wales. It is 1 mile (1.6 km) east of Cardigan, 74.7 miles (120.2 km) from Cardiff and 196.3 miles (315.8 km) from London. Treforgan is represented in the Senedd by Elin Jones (Plaid Cymru) and is part of the Ceredigion Preseli constituency in the House of Commons.

The property is notable for being one of just a few houses in the county, built in the style on John Nash.

== See also ==
- List of localities in Wales by population
