= Neuadd Trefawr =

Village in Ceredigion, Wales

Coordinates: 52.087006°N 4.542577°W

- Location within Ceredigion
- OS grid reference: SN 2590 4623
  - Cardiff: 71.9 mi (115.7 km)
  - London: 192.8 mi (310.3 km)
- Community: Beulah
- Principal area: Ceredigion
- Country: Wales
- Sovereign state: United Kingdom
- Post town: Cardigan
- Postcode district: SA43
- Police: Dyfed-Powys
- Fire: Mid and West Wales
- Ambulance: Welsh
- UK Parliament: Ceredigion Preseli
- Senedd Cymru – Welsh Parliament: Ceredigion

Neuadd Trefawr (sometimes spelt Noyadd Trefawr, due to the local accent) is a small village in the community of Beulah, Ceredigion, Wales, which is 71.9 miles (115.8 km) from Cardiff and 192.8 miles (310.3 km) from London. Neuadd Trefawr is represented in the Senedd by Elin Jones (Plaid Cymru) and is part of the Ceredigion Preseli constituency in the House of Commons.

Noyadd Trefawr is also the name of a Grade II* listed house in the community, which following major refurbishment in April 2017 has been operating as a Guest House.

== See also ==
- List of localities in Wales by population
