= Monachty =

Village in Ceredigion, Wales

Coordinates: 52.236085°N 4.190576°W

- Location within Ceredigion
- OS grid reference: SN 5051 6203
  - Cardiff: 67.8 mi (109.1 km)
  - London: 180.4 mi (290.3 km)
- Community: Dyffryn Arth
- Principal area: Ceredigion
- Country: Wales
- Sovereign state: United Kingdom
- Post town: Aberystwyth
- Postcode district: SY23
- Police: Dyfed-Powys
- Fire: Mid and West Wales
- Ambulance: Welsh
- UK Parliament: Ceredigion Preseli
- Senedd Cymru – Welsh Parliament: Ceredigion

Monachty is a small village in the community of Dyffryn Arth, Ceredigion, Wales, which is 67.8 miles (109.1 km) from Cardiff and 180.4 miles (290.4 km) from London. Monachty is represented in the Senedd by Elin Jones (Plaid Cymru) and the Member of Parliament is Ben Lake (Plaid Cymru).

== See also ==
- List of localities in Wales by population
