= Alban Square, Aberaeron =

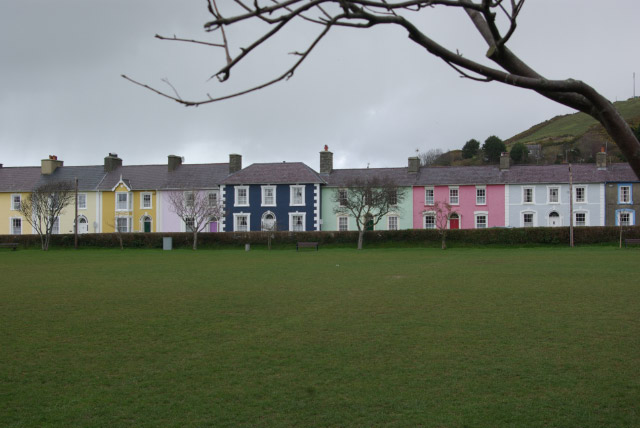
- "A well preserved terrace in a key location"

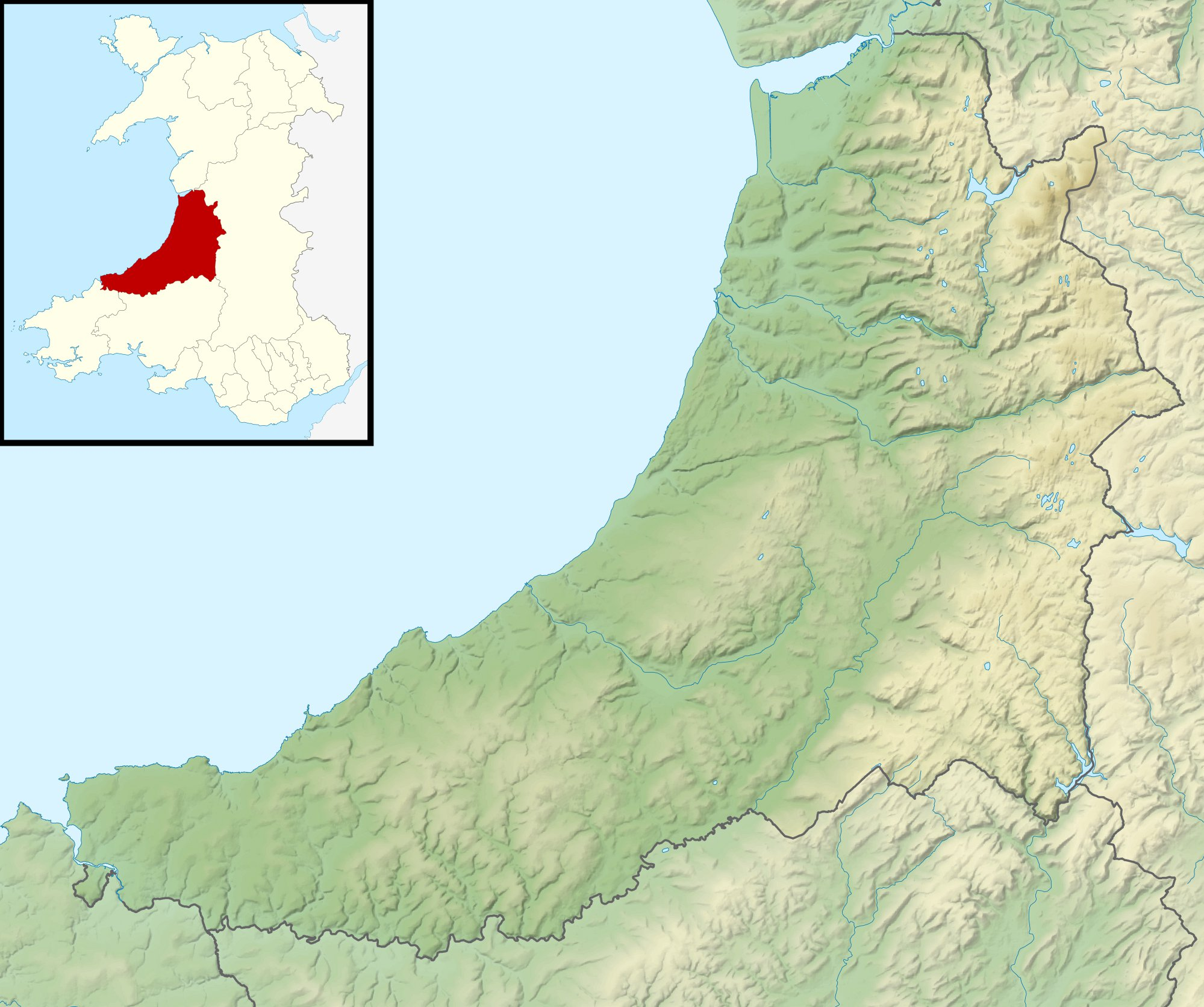
- Location within Ceredigion
- 52.2429°N 4.2574°W
- Type: Terrace
- Location: Aberaeron, Ceredigion, Wales

History
- Built: c.1830

Site notes
- Architect: Edward Haycock Sr. - overall plan
- Architectural style: Regency
- Governing body: Privately owned

Listed Building – Grade II*
- Official name: 9-20 Alban Square
- Designated: 28 September 1961
- Reference no.: 10077

Alban Square, in the centre of Aberaeron, Ceredigion, Wales is a range of early 19th century townhouses. The town of Aberaeron was developed around 1810 as a port by the Rev. Alban Thomas Jones Gwynne, a local landowner. After his father's death in 1819, Colonel A.T.J. Gwynne engaged Edward Haycock Sr. to plan a major expansion. Leases were sold in the early 1830s and Alban Square was designed, but largely unbuilt, by 1834. The town grew as a centre for shipbuilding and commerce. The expansion of the railways, and their arrival in Aberaeron in 1909 brought these commercial endeavours to an end and the town became a seaside resort and a centre for local government. No.s 9-20 inclusive on Alban Square are Grade II* listed buildings, their Cadw listing records describing the square as "a well preserved terrace in a key location".

== History ==
Aberaeron is a relatively unusual example in Wales of a planned settlement. The town was developed in the very early 19th century by the Rev. Alban Thomas Jones Gwynne. Gwynne had amassed a large local landholding in the area through marriage and in 1807 obtained permission for the development of a port by Act of Parliament. Although work on the harbour proceeded swiftly, the construction of the intended residential areas behind it progressed more slowly. By 1819 Gywnne was dead, and no further work was undertaken during the time of his widow. Her death in 1830 saw their son, Colonel A.T.J. Gwynne, reinvigorate activities and in that year he engaged Edward Haycock Sr. to draw up plans. (Note: A lease dating from the early 1830s references "Mr Haycock's plan".) Haycock, son of an architect, lived most of his life in Shrewsbury and developed an extensive practice in Shropshire, the Welsh Borders and South Wales. Haycock worked out a grid plan development and leases on plots were sold from the 1830s onwards. Alban Square was the premier plot. The development of the town continued as a centre for trade and shipbuilding throughout the 19th century, but declined in the early 20th century with the arrival in the area of the railways. By the 21st century, Aberaeron's economy had refocussed on tourism and local government. The town is now the site of Neuadd Cyngor Ceredigion (English: Ceredigion Council Hall) at Penmorfa, the headquarters of Ceredigion County Council.

== Architecture and description ==
No.s 9-20 form the eastern side of Alban Square. No.s 1-8 form the northern, and No.s 22-37 the western sides. Thomas Lloyd, Julian Orbach and Robert Scourfield, in their Carmarthenshire and Ceredigion volume in the Pevsner Buildings of Wales series, do not consider that the scale of the buildings is sufficient "to give a sense of enclosure to the grassy central space." The houses are built to a "simple" Regency design and are of two storeys. The roofs are of Welsh slate. The houses were painted in varying pastel colours in the 20th century. While Lloyd, Orbach and Scourfield do not think this represents an "authentic restoration", they acknowledge that the present appearance "entertains".

The Cadw listing record for the terrace describes it as "a well preserved terrace in a key location". No.s 9-20 are each separately designated by Cadw, the statutory body with responsibility for the listing of buildings in Wales, as Grade II* listed buildings. This is the second-highest grade and indicates "particularly important buildings of more than special interest". No.s 1-8 and 22-37 on the northern and western sides of the square are designated Grade II.

== Sources ==
- Colvin, Howard (1978) [1956]. A Biographical Dictionary of British Architects 1600–1840. London: John Murray. ISBN 978-0-719-53328-0.
- Lloyd, Thomas; Orbach, Julian; Scourfield, Robert (2006). Carmarthenshire and Ceredigion. The Buildings of Wales. New Haven, US and London: Yale University Press. ISBN 978-0-300-10179-9.
