= Edward Haycock Sr. =

English architect (1790 - 1870)

Edward Haycock
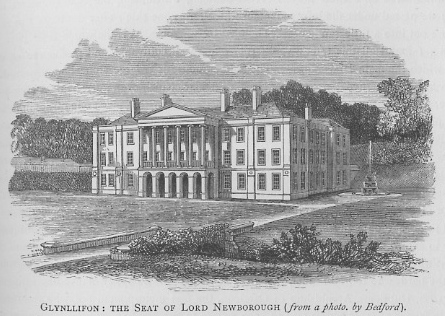
- Glynllifon, Caernarfonshire. From Nicholls "Annals and Antiquities of Wales", 1872. Vol 1, 315
- Born: 29 July 1790; Shrewsbury
- Died: 20 December 1870 (aged 80); Shrewsbury
- Education: A pupil of Sir Jeffrey Wyattville
- Occupation: Architect
- Father: John Hiram Haycock
- Practice: J H and E Haycock c1815-30
- Buildings: Millichope, Glynllifon and Clytha Park.
- Projects: The planned town at Aberaeron, Ceredigion

Edward Haycock Sr. (29 July 1790 – 20 December 1870) was an English architect renowned for his work in the West Midlands and central and southern Wales during the late Georgian and early Victorian periods.

== Biography ==
Haycock was the grandson of William Haycock (1725–1802) of Shrewsbury and the son of John Hiram Haycock (1759–1830), who were architects and building contractors. He joined the family business after 1810 and assumed control following his father's death in 1830. Around 1845, he transitioned from building contracting to focus solely on architecture, with his son Edward Haycock Junior (1829/30-1882) later joining the practice and continuing it until about 1880.

On 13 February 1827, Haycock married Mary Hatton at St Sepulchre-without-Newgate, London and had three sons and four daughters.

In addition to his architectural career, Haycock was active in the political life of Shrewsbury as a Conservative. He served on the council for thirty-four years, became an alderman, and was mayor in 1842. He was a friend of the Shrewsbury architect John Carline and also of Dr Robert Waring Darwin, the father of the naturalist Charles Darwin.

He died on 20 December 1870 at his home, The Priory, Shrewsbury, aged 80 and was buried in St Chad's churchyard.

"Haycock Way", linking Shrewsbury's 20th century inner ring road to the Column roundabout at Abbey Foregate, is named after the family.

== Architectural career ==
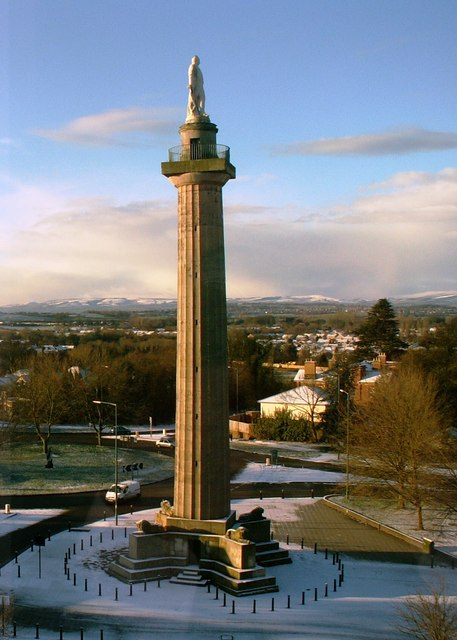
Lord Hill's column, Shrewsbury 1815. Designed by Edward Haycock and modified by Thomas Harrison.

Haycock professionally trained in London under Sir Jeffrey Wyattville, exhibiting at the Royal Academy between 1808 and 1810. He then rejoined his father in the family building firm, working as builder and architect until about 1845, when he became a full-time architect. Work for the Gwynne family of Monachty led to the planning of Aberaeron. He was appointed County Surveyor of Shropshire from 1834 to 1866.

=== Associations and style ===
Haycock was part of a group of architects, including Thomas Farnolls Pritchard, Joseph Bromfield and John Carline, who established Shrewsbury as a major centre for architectural innovation in the later 18th and first half of the 19th century. This group gained many major architectural commissions in Shropshire and over much of Wales, despite competition from major London architects. Edward Haycock Snr specialised as a Gothic Revival architect.

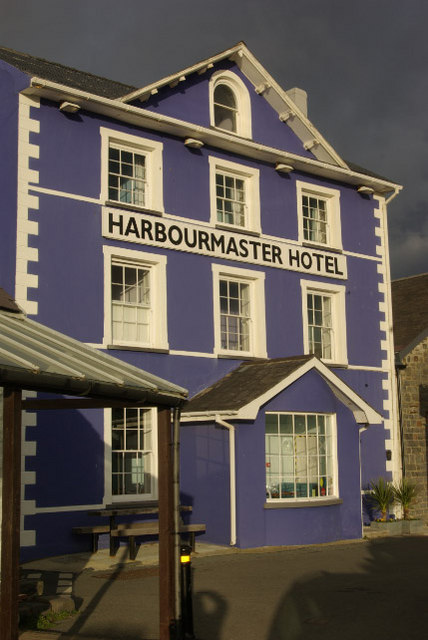
Harbourmaster Hotel, Aberaeron

His father had used the Ionic order very effectively on the ill-fated Shrewsbury Shirehall and Edward Haycock continued with the use of Ionic orders on his major projects as at Millichope Park, Glynllifon and Clytha Park. His churches tend to be more pedestrian, using a simplified Gothic, often with crocketed pinnacles on the towers. A departure from this is St Catherine's, Doddington, (a suburb of Whitchurch, Shropshire) 1836–7, which has an impressive Grecian revival facade.

=== Town of Aberaeron ===
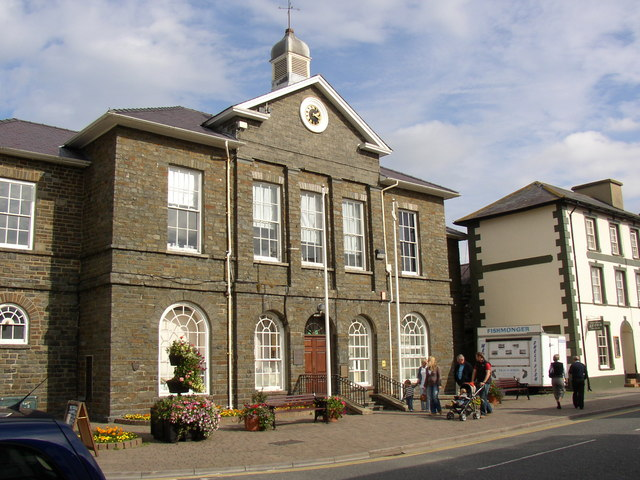
County Hall, Market Street, Aberaeron, 1833-4

Aberaeron was founded by Rev. Alban Thomas Jones Gwynne following an Act of Parliament in 1807, but it appears that town did not start to be laid out until about 1830. Edward Haycock was employed by Colonel A J Gwynne for supervising the building of houses and their layout in a grid plan around squares, including the principal one, Alban Square. In 1833, Samuel Lewis's “Topographical Dictionary of Wales” records “Upwards of thirty new leases have been granted, pursuant to which several houses have been already built, and others are already in progress; a general post-office, a posting-house and an excellent hotel have been established". The Town Hall (1833–35), which later became the Cardiganshire County Hall, a typical building in Haycock's style, soon followed. The building of the planned town continued until the 1850s with a house in Portland Place being dated 1855. The posting house mentioned by Lewis could be the Castle and the hotel could be the Harbourmaster Hotel. Haycock achieved a consistency of style throughout the project which results in the attractive appearance of Aberaeron today.

== List of architectural work ==
=== Public buildings and monuments ===
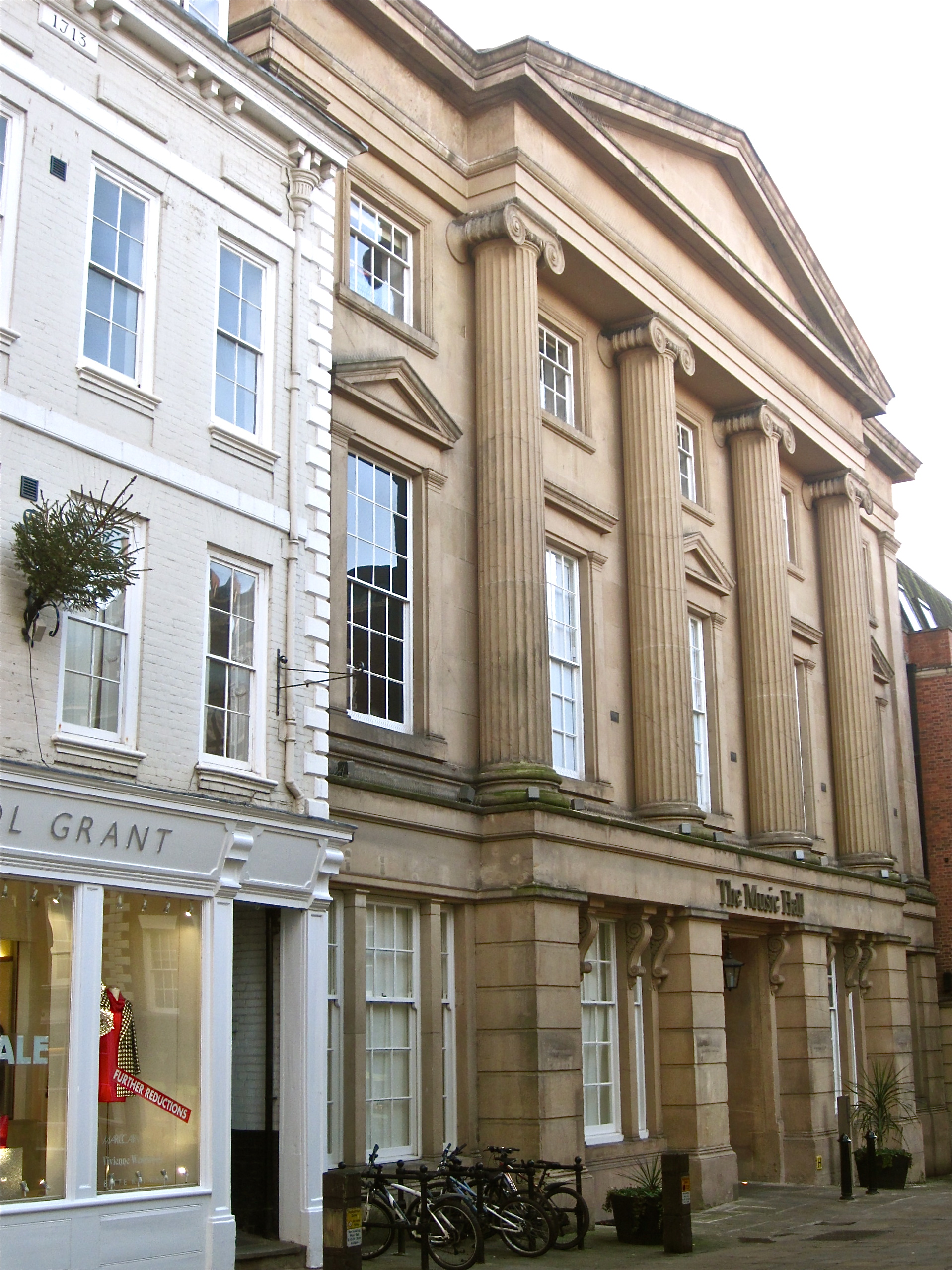
The Music Hall, Shrewsbury by Edward Haycock

- Shrewsbury 1814–16: Lord Hill's Column at Shrewsbury (assisted by Thomas Harrison of Chester
- Shrewsbury, The Butter Market, Pride Hill, 1819–20, demolished 1830 – New Butter Market
- Dolgellau, Merionethshire, The County Hall, 1823-5
- Coed-Cwnwr Almshouses, Monmouthshire, 1825
- Shire Hall, Presteigne 1826-9
- Shrewsbury, The Salop Infirmary, rebuild 1827–30
- Monmouth, Shire Hall extension, c. 1830
- Old Town Hall, Ellesmere, 1833
- Cardiff, The Market
- Neath Market, 1835-6
- Shrewsbury Savings Bank
- Shrewsbury The Music Hall, 1839–40
- Wrockwardine Almshouses
- Dowlais Market Hall
- Llandovery National School
- Llandeilo Bridge, 1848
- Shrewsbury Lancastrian School
- Shrewsbury St Chad's School, 1859
- Shropshire County Lunatic Asylum alterations

A newspaper obituary states Haycock also "obtained first prizes for plans for the Birmingham and New Orleans Infirmaries" but these are not mentioned by Colvin.

=== Churches ===
Shropshire

- Shrewsbury St George, Frankwell 1829–32
- Tilstock 1835
- Whitchurch, St Catherine, Doddington. 1836-7
- Cruckton 1840
- Cressage 1841
- Cound 1842-3
- Bayston Hill 1843
- Clun Chapel Lawn 1843
- Hope 1843
- Middleton-in-Chirbury 1843
- Dorrington 1843-5
- Newcastle 1848
- Church Pulverbatch 1852-3
- Christ Church Shelton and Oxon 1854

Staffordshire

- Tettenhall 1825

Breconshire

- Hay on Wye 1833-4

Cardiganshire

- Aberaeron 1835

Carmarthenshire

- Carmarthen St David.
- Llannon 1841

Ceredigion

- Aberaeron
- Aberystwyth St Michael 1830-3
- St David's Church, Barmouth 1830

Glamorgan

- Caerphilly 1826
- Tai Bach Margam 1827
- Beulah Calvinistic Methodist Chapel, Groes, 1838

Merioneth

- Barmouth 1830

Monmouthshire

- Abersychan 1831-2
- Trevethin St Thomas 1831-2
- Lanvaud 1843

Montgomeryshire

- Machynlleth 1827

=== Country houses ===
Shropshire

- Onslow Hall 1815–20 – Remodelled house for John Wingfield
- Loton Park – Reconstructed south front 1819.
- Hodnet Rectory. For Rev Reginald Heber. Presumably a joint design with his father.
- Stanton Lacy Downton Hall near Ludlow. 1824 – New front entrance
- Clungunford House.1825-8. For the Rev John Rocke.
- Orleton Hall. Refronted house c1830.
- Walford Manor 1831–5.
- Leaton Knolls. c1835. Demolished 1955.
- Millichope Park, Shropshire 1835–40, Greek Revival house for Rev. R. N. Pemberton.
- Longner Hall. Alterations 1838–42.
- Condover Vicarage 1843. Tudorish.
- Badger Hall. Alterations 1849–50.
- Netley Hall, Shropshire.1854-8.
- Stanton Lacy Vicarage.

Herefordshire

- Shobdon Court. Alterations c1830-5.
- Shobdon Rectory. 1844.

Northamptonshire

- Kelmarsh Hall. Minor alterations 1842.
- Farthingstone Rectory. Enlarged 1842–3.

Caernarfonshire

- Glynllifon 1836–49. For Lord Newborough.

Carmarthenshire

- Stradey Castle 1849–53.

Cardiganshire

- Llansantffraed Alltlwyd House 1832.
- Plas Llangoedmor, Rebuilt 1833.
- Monordeifi (Manordeifi), Clynfyw c1849-50 (now Pembrokeshire).
- Llandygwydd Penlyan. 1852.

Ceredigion

- Nanteos Portico, new dining room and new frontage to stable block, c. 1839–49. The original stable block appear to have been built to designs by John Nash in c. 1813–15.

Glamorgan

- Penrice Castle Minor Works.
- Swansea Penllergare. 1836. Demolished except for a lodge and observatory.
- Sketty Hall −1830s Entrance hall

Montgomeryshire

- Welshpool Rectory
- Churchstoke Vicarage. Enlarged 1846–7.

Monmouthshire

- Clytha Park 1824–28 – House for William Jones

Neath Port Talbot

- Margam Castle 1830-1835 - Haycock worked as supervising architect, in support of Thomas Hopper

Radnorshire

- Stanage Park. Alterations 1845.

== Gallery ==
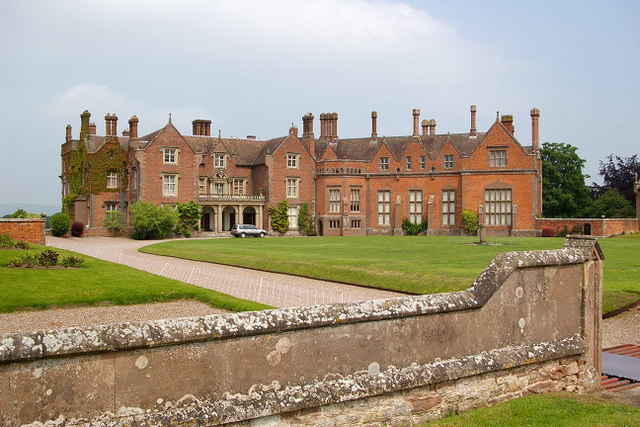
Loton Park

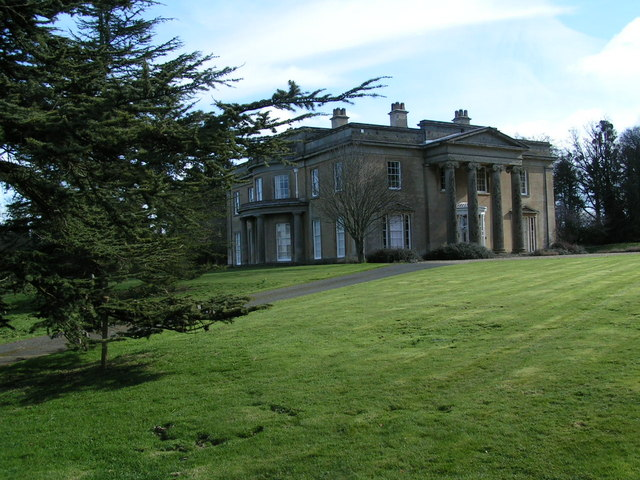
Clytha Park

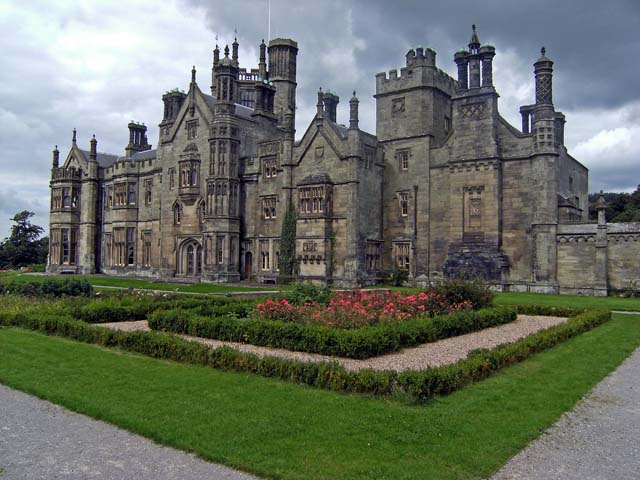
Margam Castle

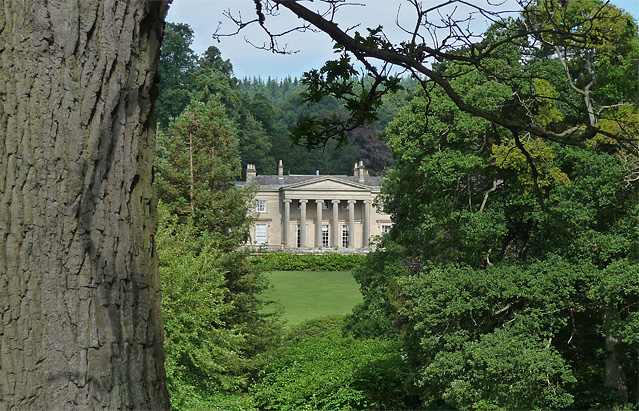
Millichope Park, Munslow

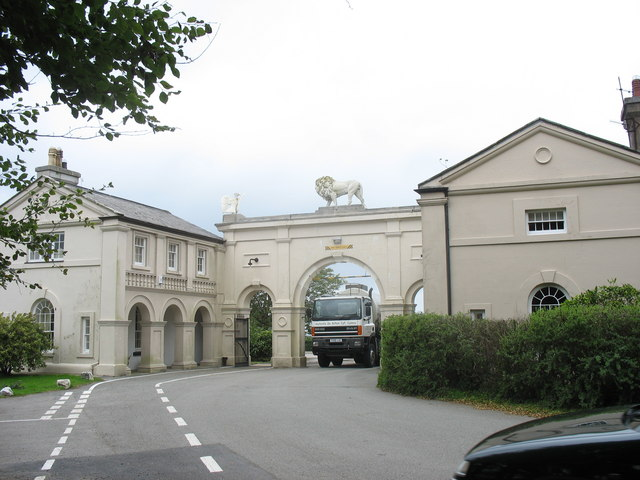
The Grand Lodge at Glynllifon from the Park

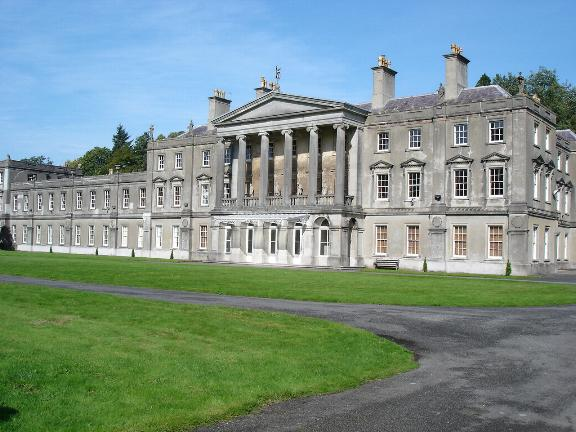
Glynllifon

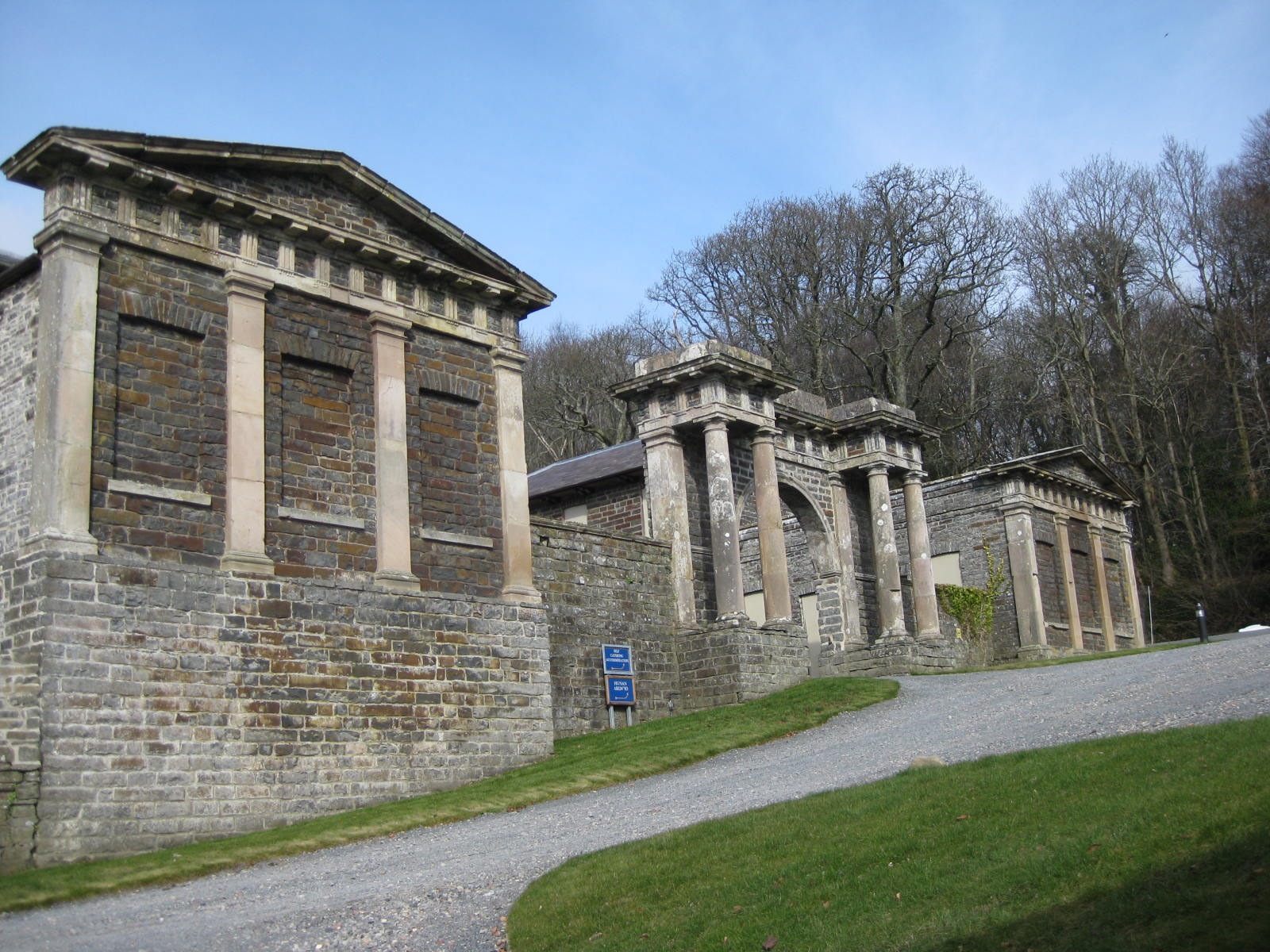
Stable Block Nanteos Ceredigion

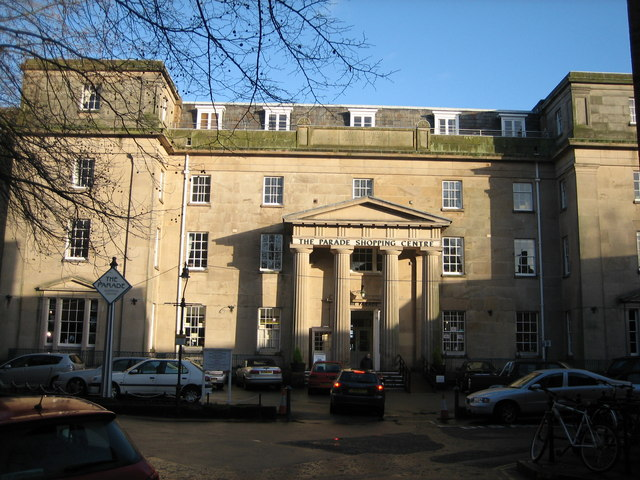
Former Royal Salop Infirmary, now Parade Shopping Centre, St Mary's Place, Shrewsbury

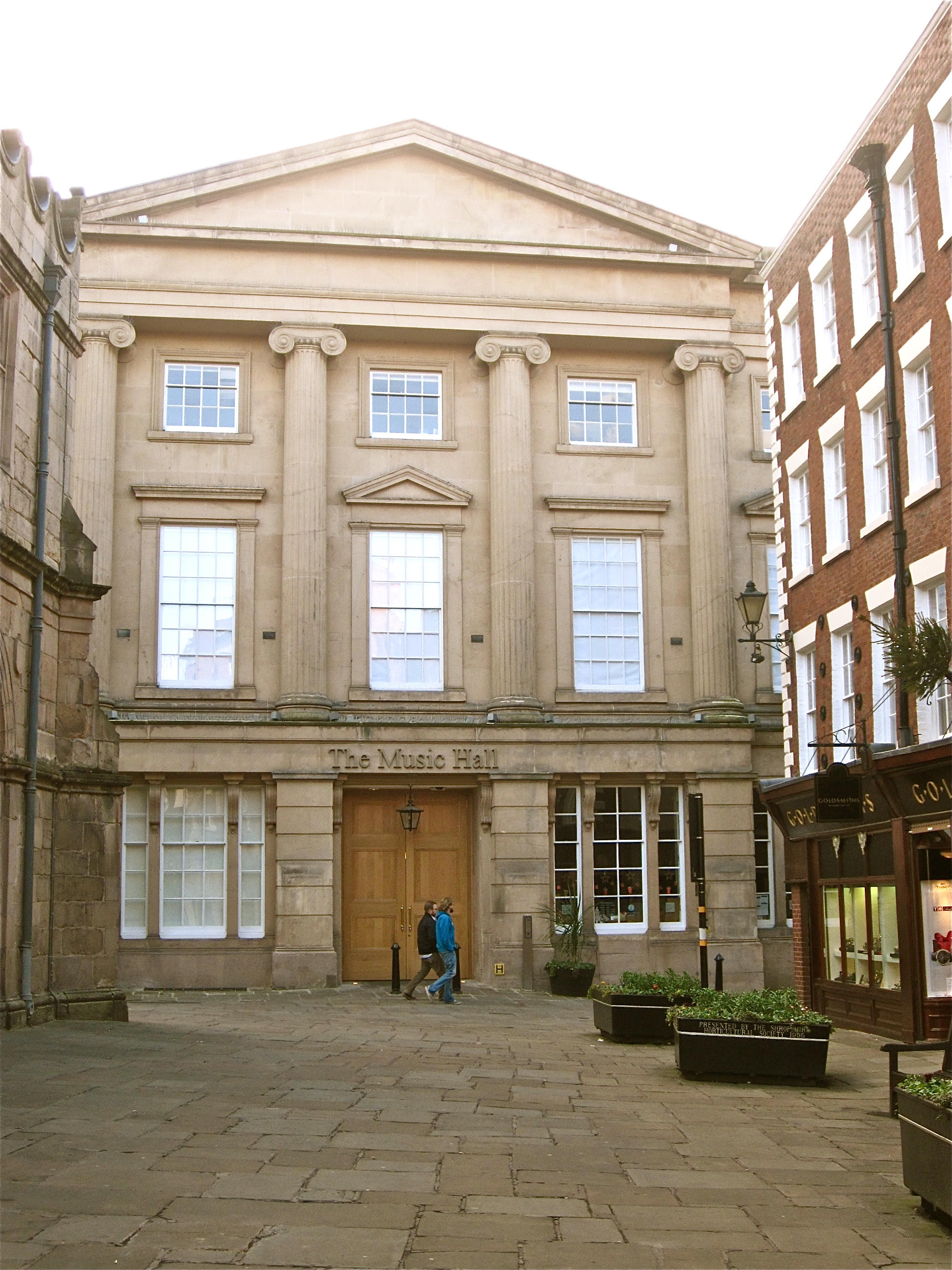
The Music Hall, Shrewsbury

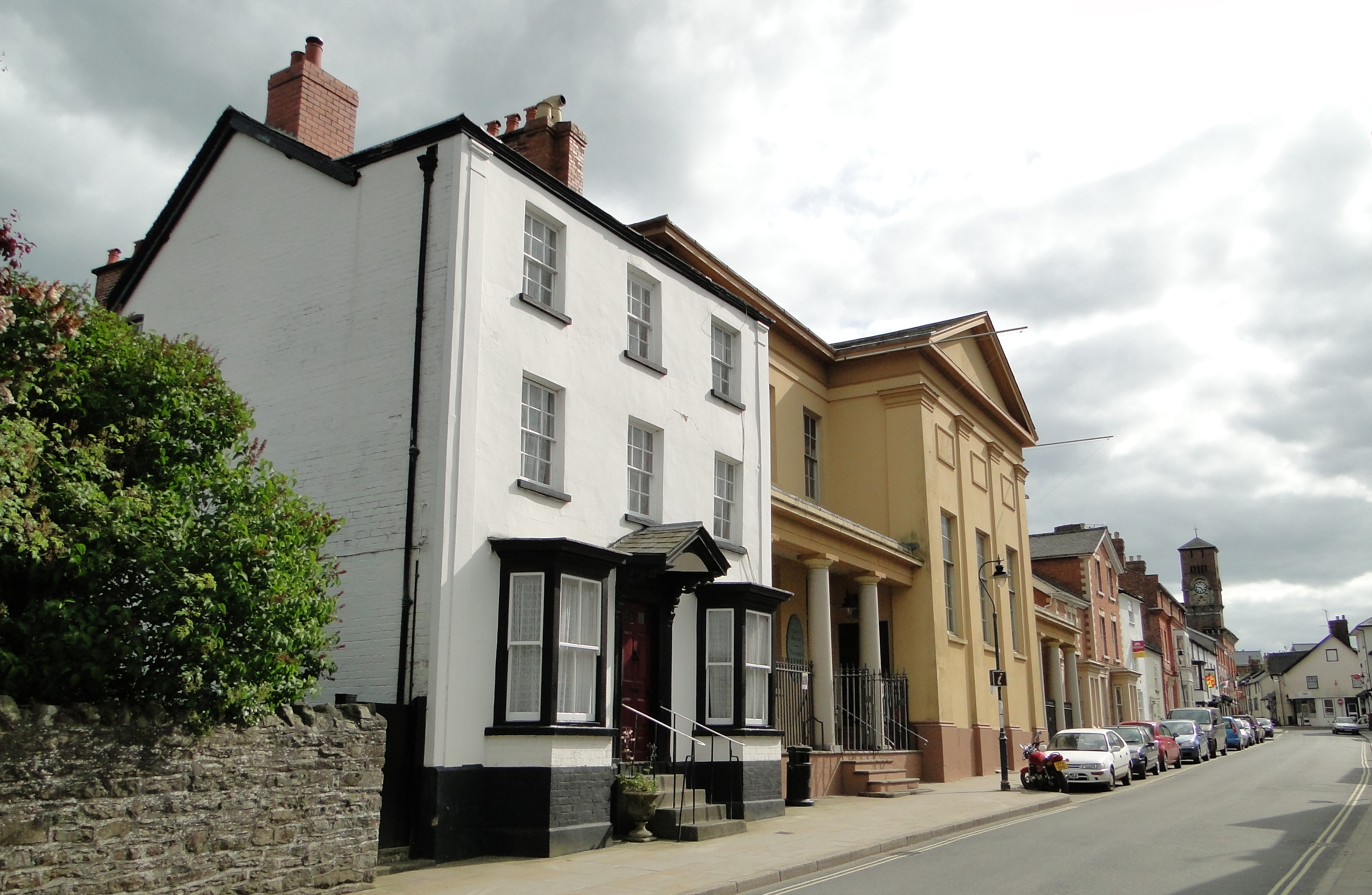
Presteigne Town Hall,(centre) Broad Street, Presteigne

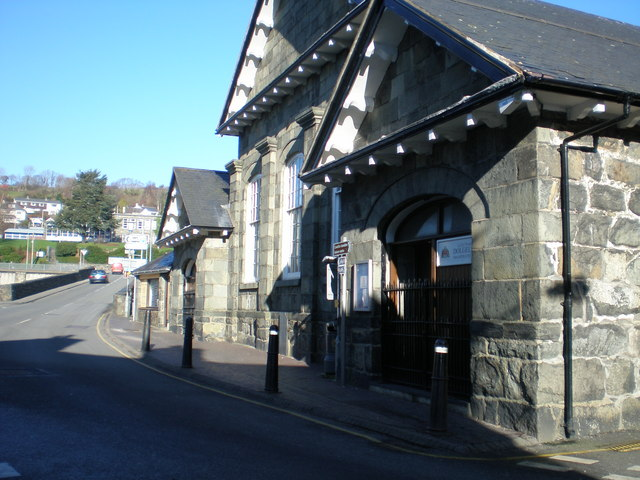
Dolgellau County Hall

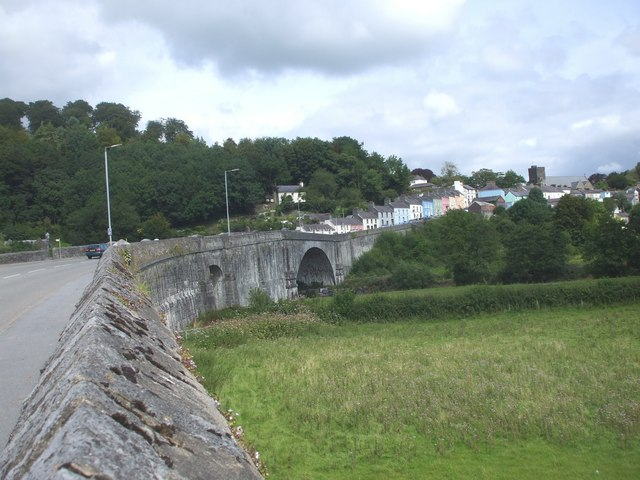
Bridge over the Tywi at Llandeilo

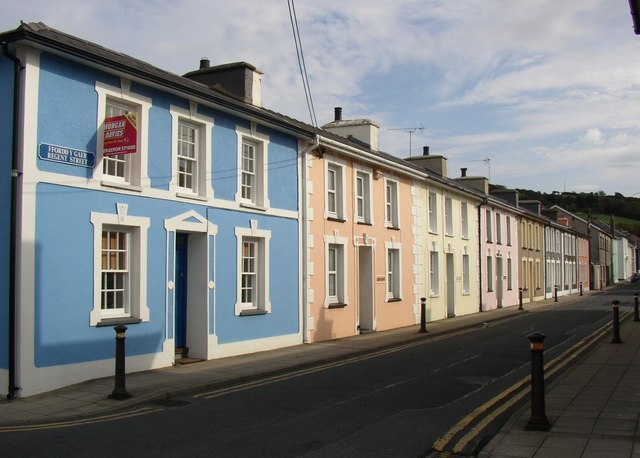
Regent Street, Aberaeron

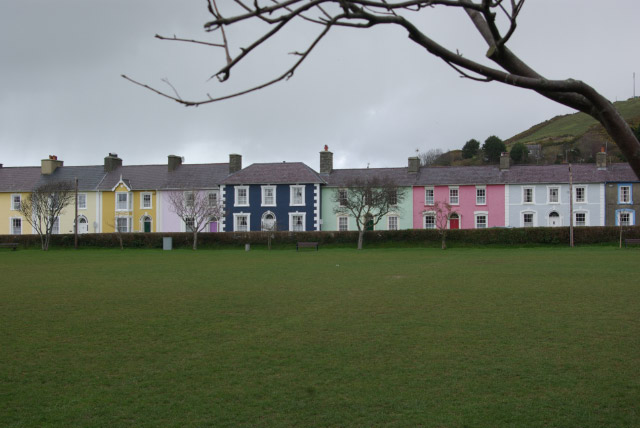
Alban Square, Aberaeron

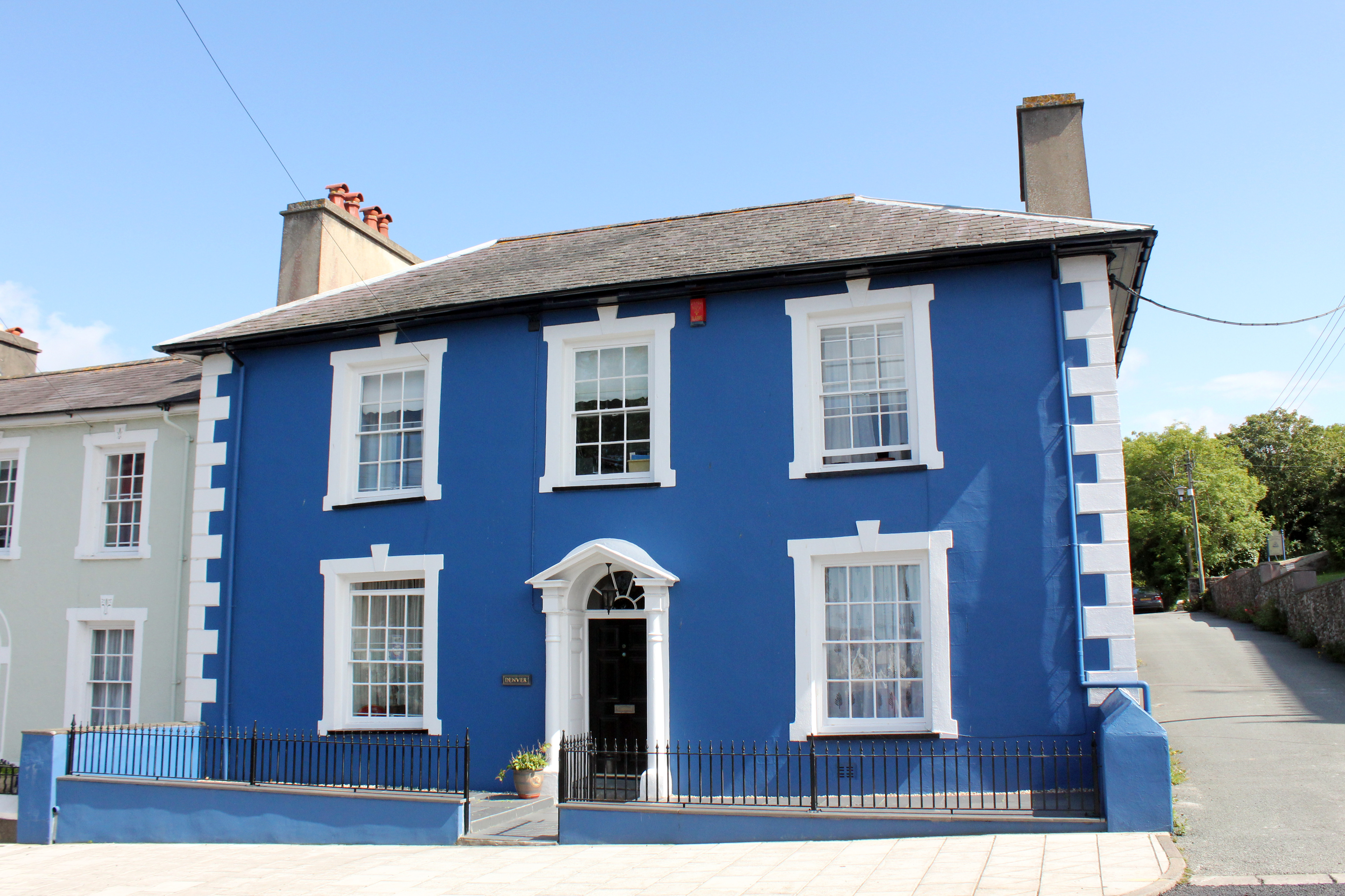
7 Portland Place

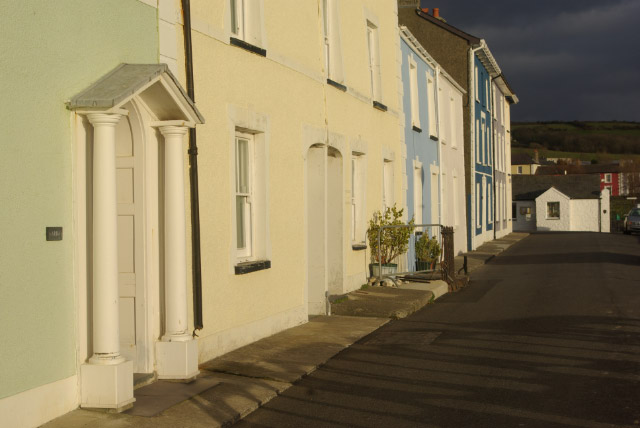
Doric pedimented doorway, Quay Parade, Aberaeron

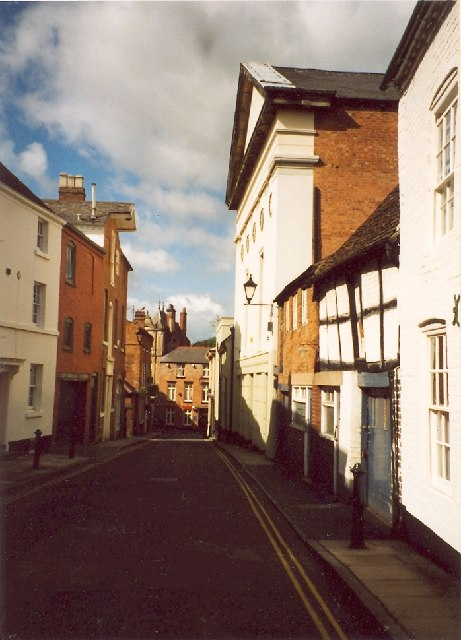
Back of Music Hall, College Hill, Shrewsbury

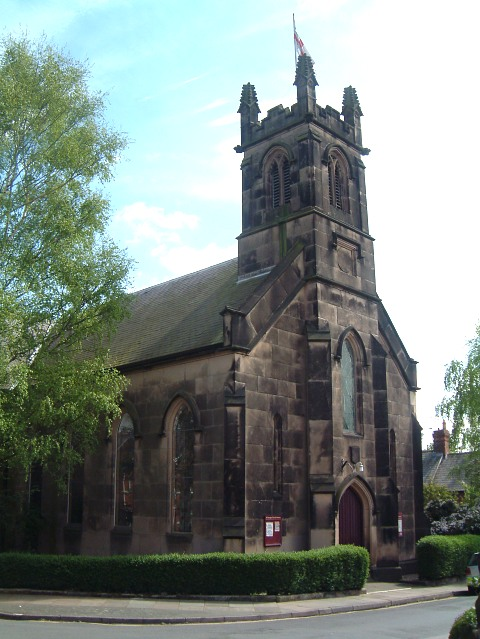
St. George's Church, Frankwell, Shrewsbury.

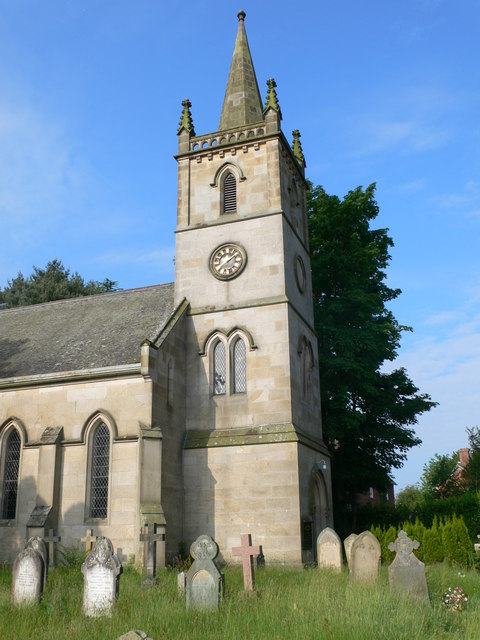
Church tower, Dorrington

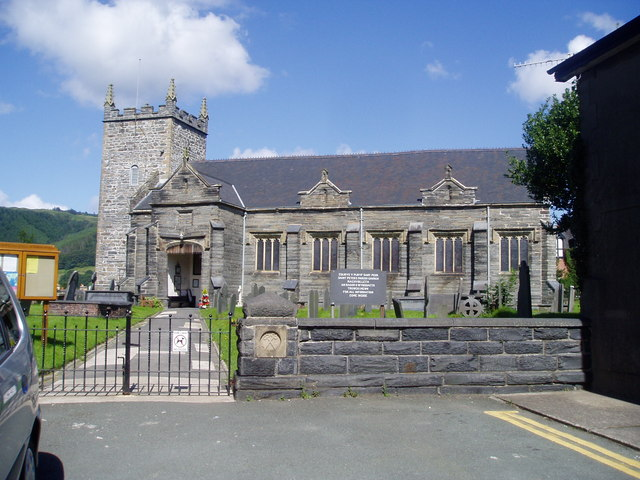
St Peters, at Machynlleth. Largely re-built 1827

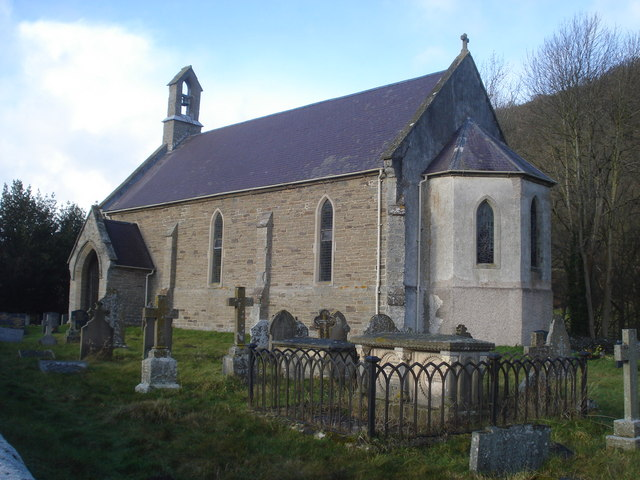
St Mary's church, Clun Chapel Lawn

== Literature ==
- Colvin H. (2008) A Biographical Dictionary of British Architects 1600–1840. Yale University Press, 4th edition London.
- Lloyd T et al.(2006):Carmarthenshire and Ceredigion: The Buildings of Wales, Yale University Press.
- J Newman and N Pevsner, (2006), The Buildings of England: Shropshire, Yale.
- R Scourfield and R Haslam (2013, The Buildings of Wales: Powys; Montgomeryshire, Radnorshire and Breconshire, Yale University Press.
