= Betws Bledrws Church =

Church near Lampeter, Ceredigion, Wales

Coordinates: 52°08′54″N 4°03′13″W

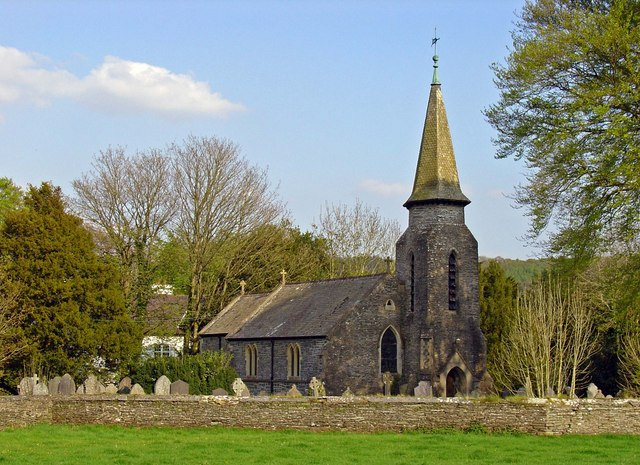
Parish church, Betws Bledrws

The present church of St Bledrws, in the village of Betws Bledrws (sometimes spelt Bettws Bledrws), near Lampeter, Ceredigion, Wales, is a 19th-century building. However, the same site is believed to have been previously used for other places of worship since much earlier times. The Coflein website states that the older church was in mediaeval times dedicated to St Michael, although the dedication had been changed to St Bledrws by 1833.

According to recently issued Notes on the History of Betws Bledrws Church (for distribution within the building), the spire and tower of the present church were built in 1830 – the date being on the weather-vane – and were possibly designed by the architect Charles Robert Cockerell. He built nearby Derry Ormond House (demolished in 1952) for a certain John Jones. Alternatively, the authors of The Buildings of Wales: Carmarthenshire and Ceredigion suggest that the conical square tower might have been by Rees Davies.

The church was for many years associated with the Inglis-Jones family, being the descendants of the said John Jones of Derry Ormond House, and they are commemorated in several internal memorials. John's grandchildren Herbert and Wilmot Inglis-Jones rebuilt the church in 1886, Wilmot, who succeeded his brother to the Derry Ormond estate in the following year, also served as organist for many years, besides being the father of the writer Elisabeth Inglis-Jones.

The font was re-erected on a modern pedestal, although the actual bowl is of particular interest, as it has a band of decoration of shallow incised lines around the upper part, which has been described as Romanesque. It is thought to be not much later than A.D. 1200. The church has some unusual and particularly special stained-glass windows, designed by Carl Almquist, a Swedish designer with the firm of Shrigley and Hunt of Lancaster. The organ was given by the Inglis-Jones family and was built by Cassons of London in 1900.

The surviving church registers date from 1813. A transcript of monumental inscriptions in the churchyard was published by the local family history society in 2018.

By the 21st century, Betws Bledrws formed part of a group ministry which also included the churches at Lampeter, Maestir, Silian and Llangybi.

Derry Ormond Tower, a high column erected by John Jones, the squire of Derry Ormond, can be seen from the churchyard path.
