= List of works by Carl Almquist =

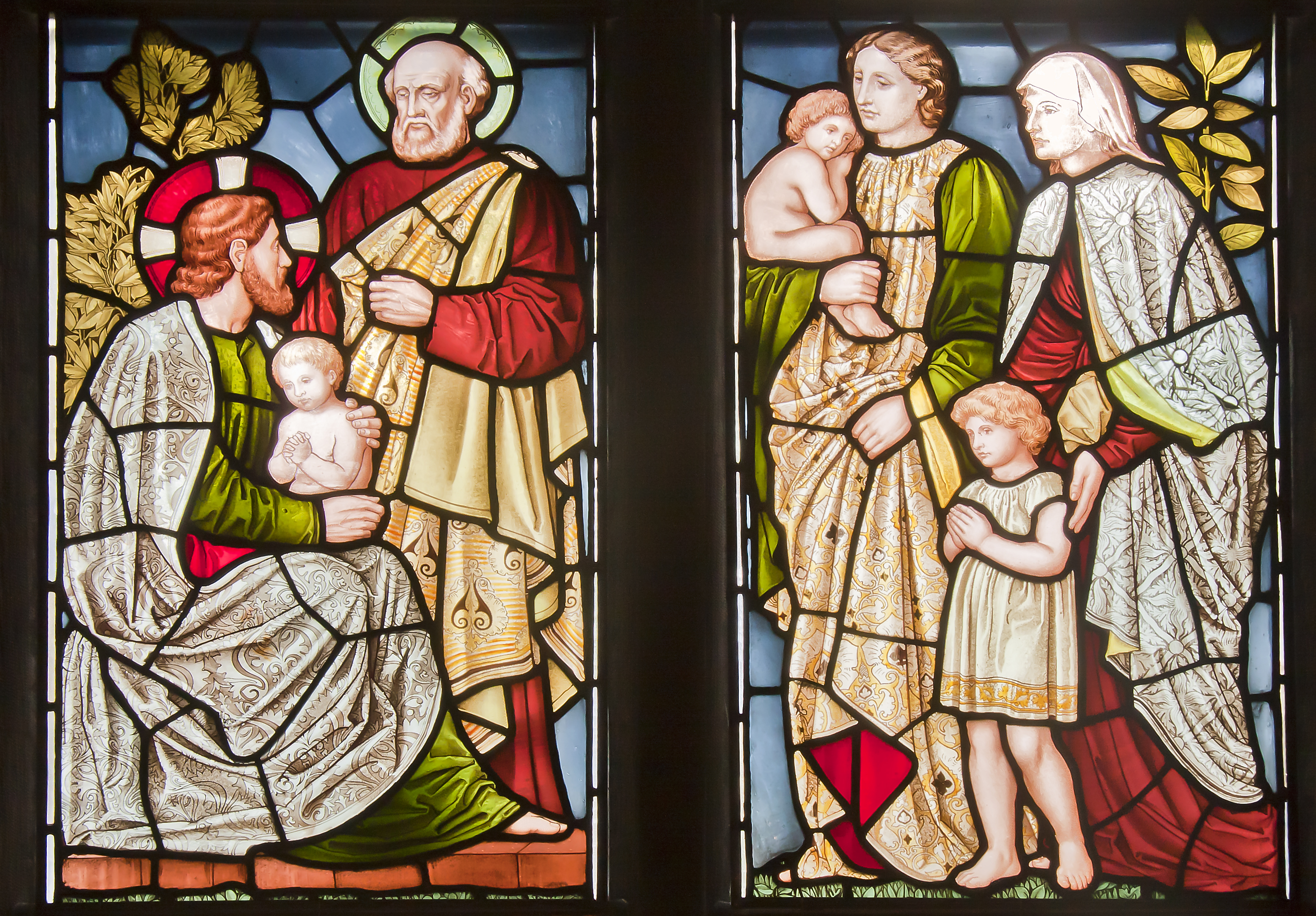
The Jesus and little children window in St. Nicholas Church, Örebro

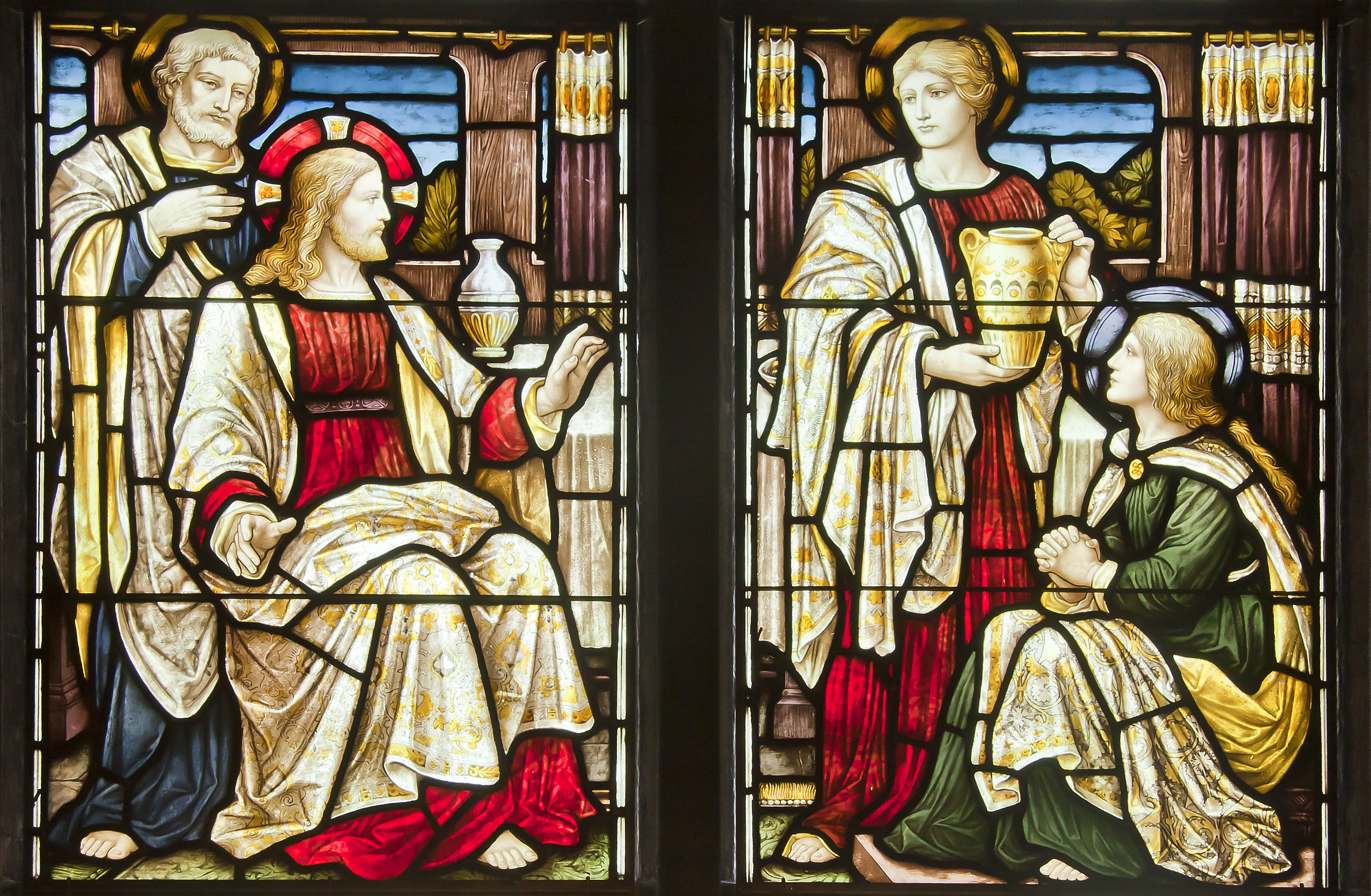
The Jesus at the home of Martha and Mary window in St. Nicholas Church, Örebro

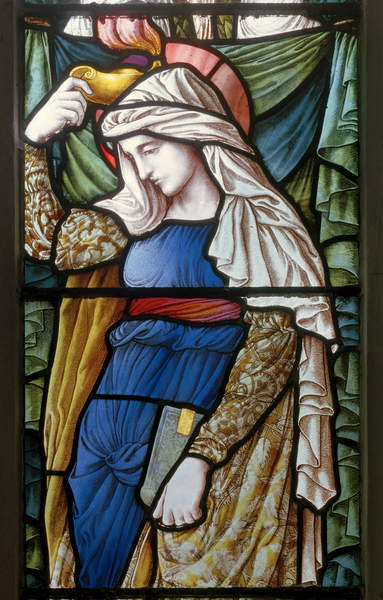
Detail of the Faith window of All Saints Church, Upper Stondon, Bedfordshire

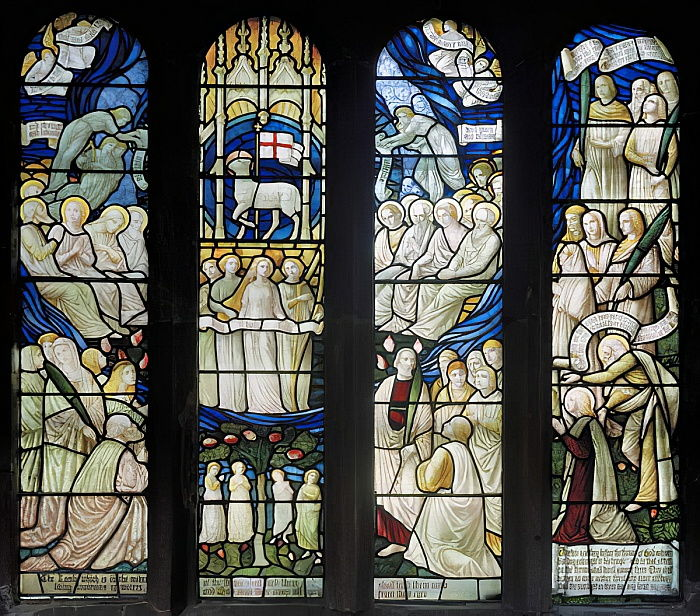
The Adoration of the Lamb window in St. Wilfrid's Church, Grappenhall, Cheshire

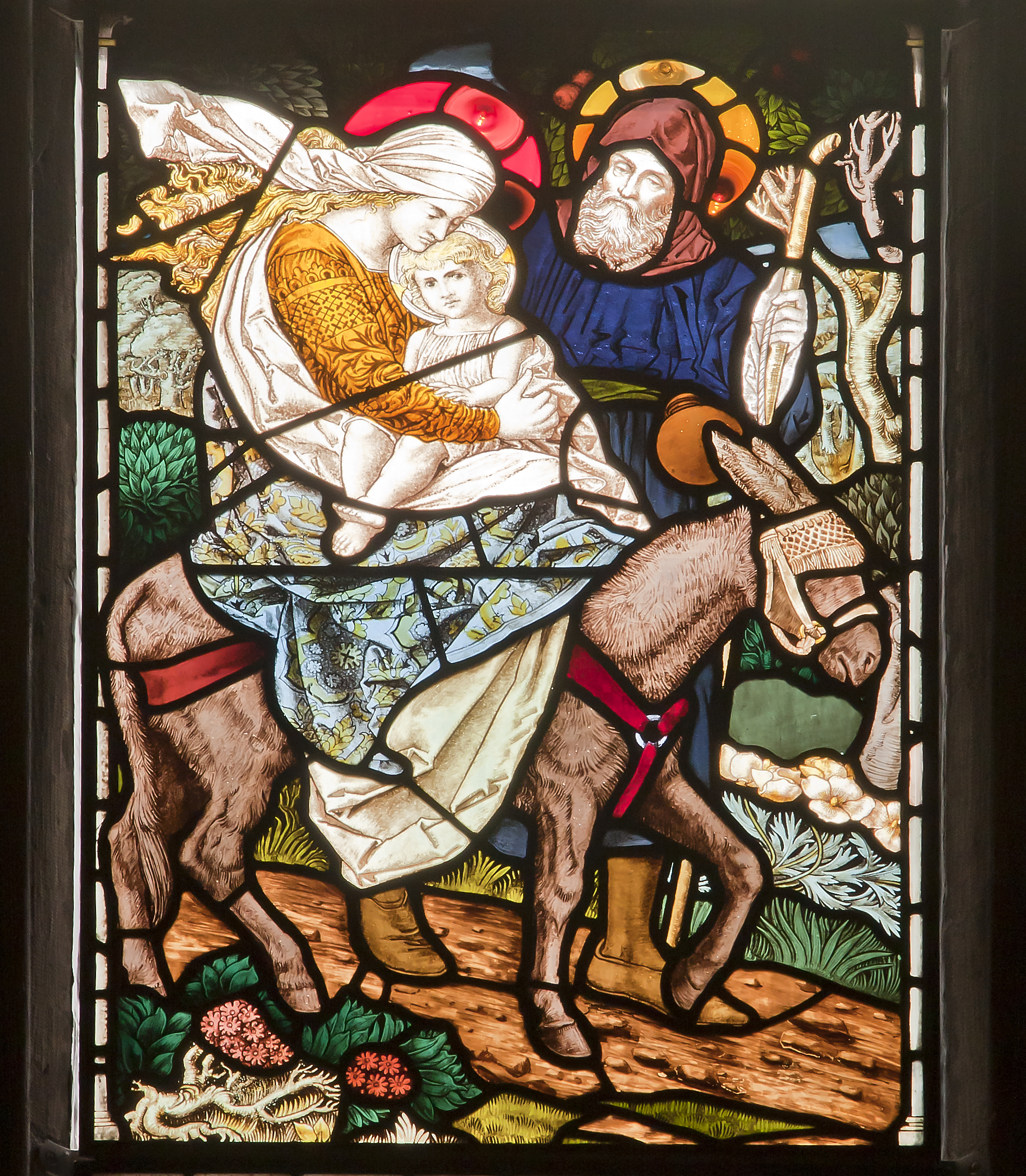
The Flight into Egypt window in St. Nicholas Church, Örebro

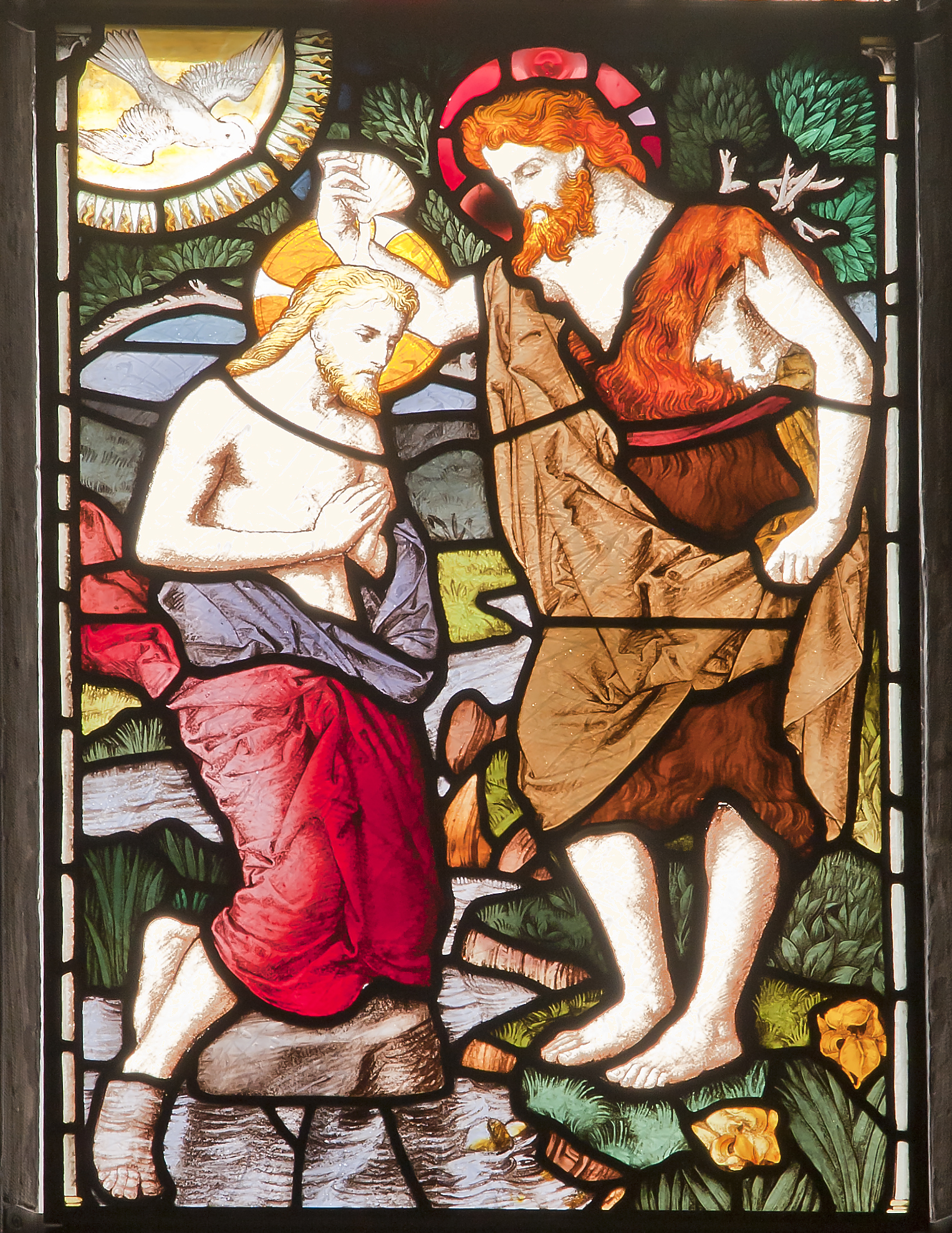
The Baptism of Jesus window in St. Nicholas Church, Örebro

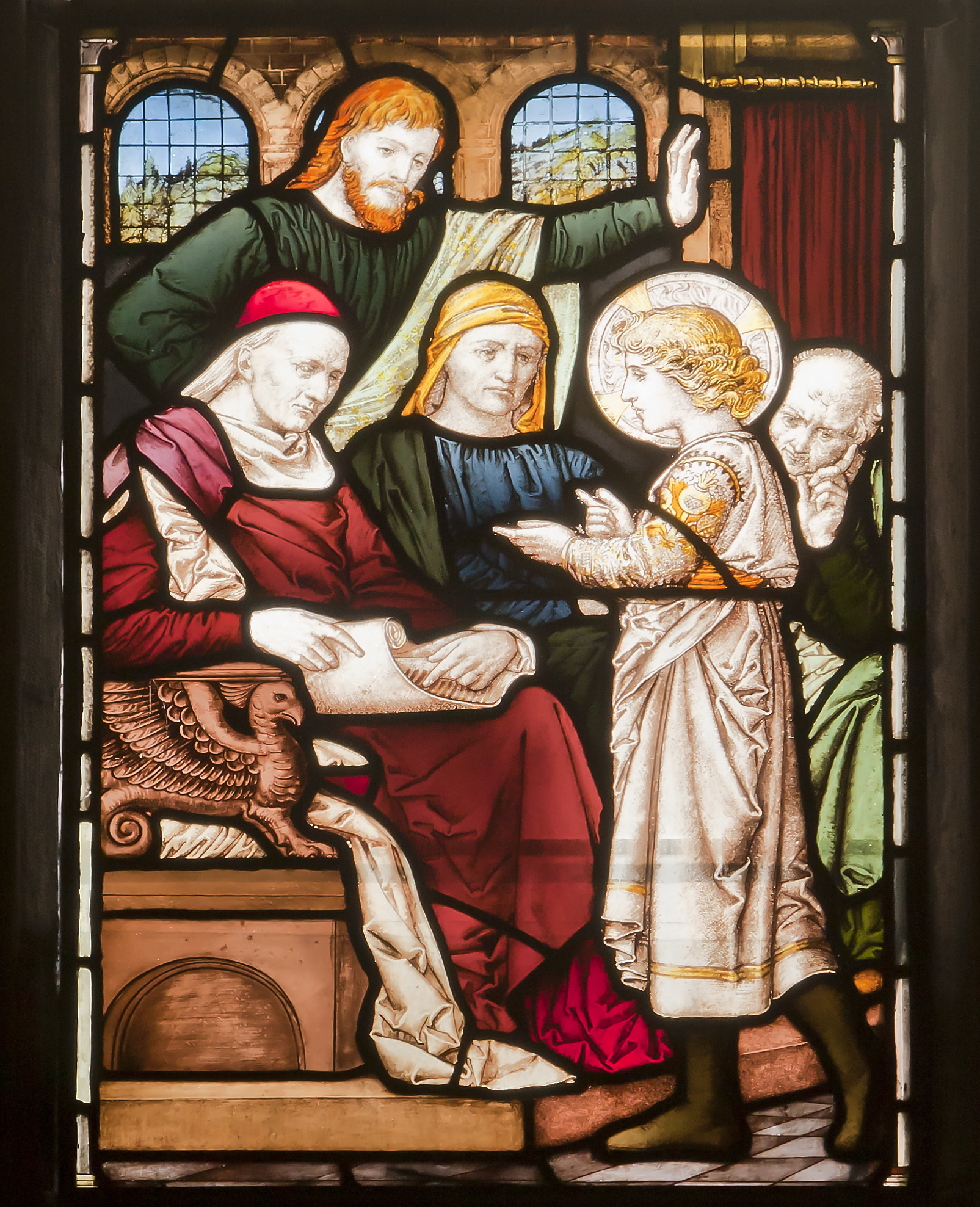
The Christ among the Doctors window in St. Nicholas Church, Örebro

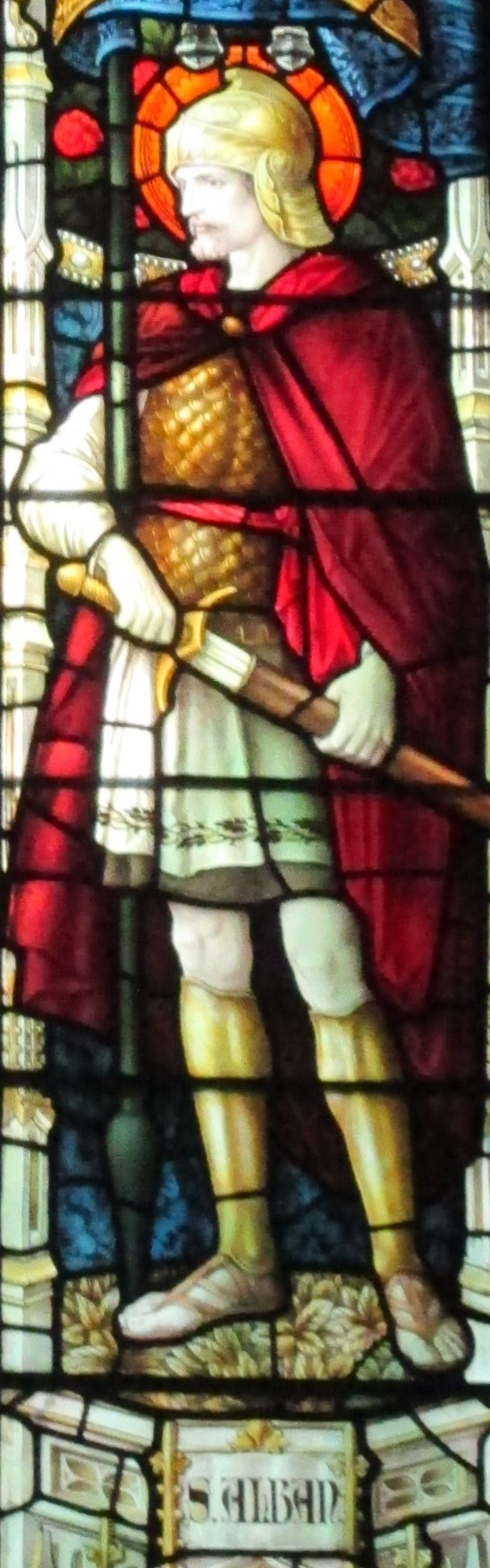
Detail of the St Alban window in Lancaster Priory

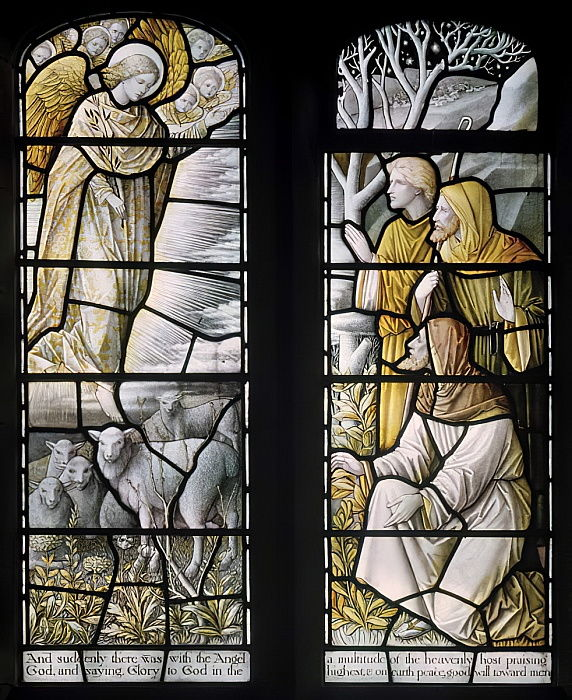
The Annunciation to the Shepherds window in Christ Church, Over Wyresdale, Lancashire

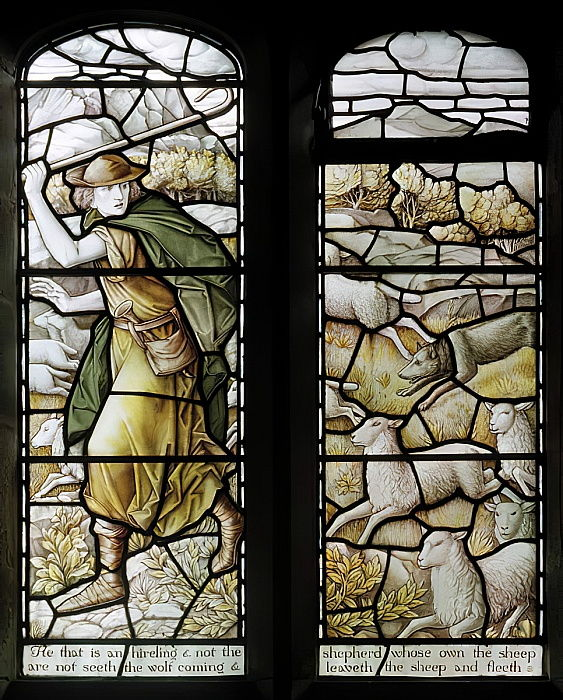
The Hireling Shepherd window in Christ Church, Over Wyresdale, Lancashire

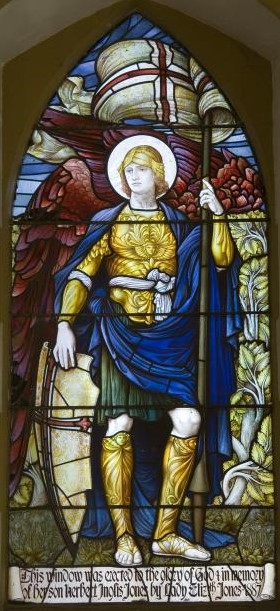
The St Michael window in Betws Bledrws Church, Ceredigion

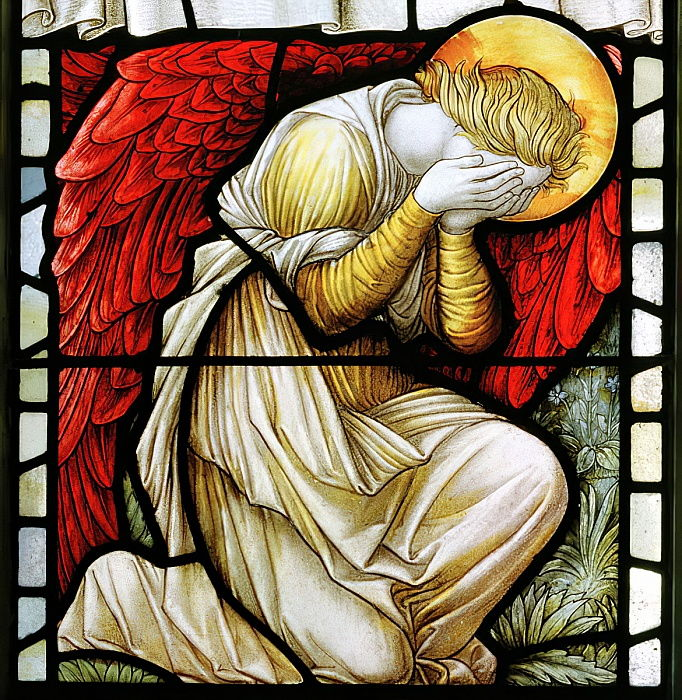
Detail of a stained-glass window in Betws Bledrws Church, Ceredigion

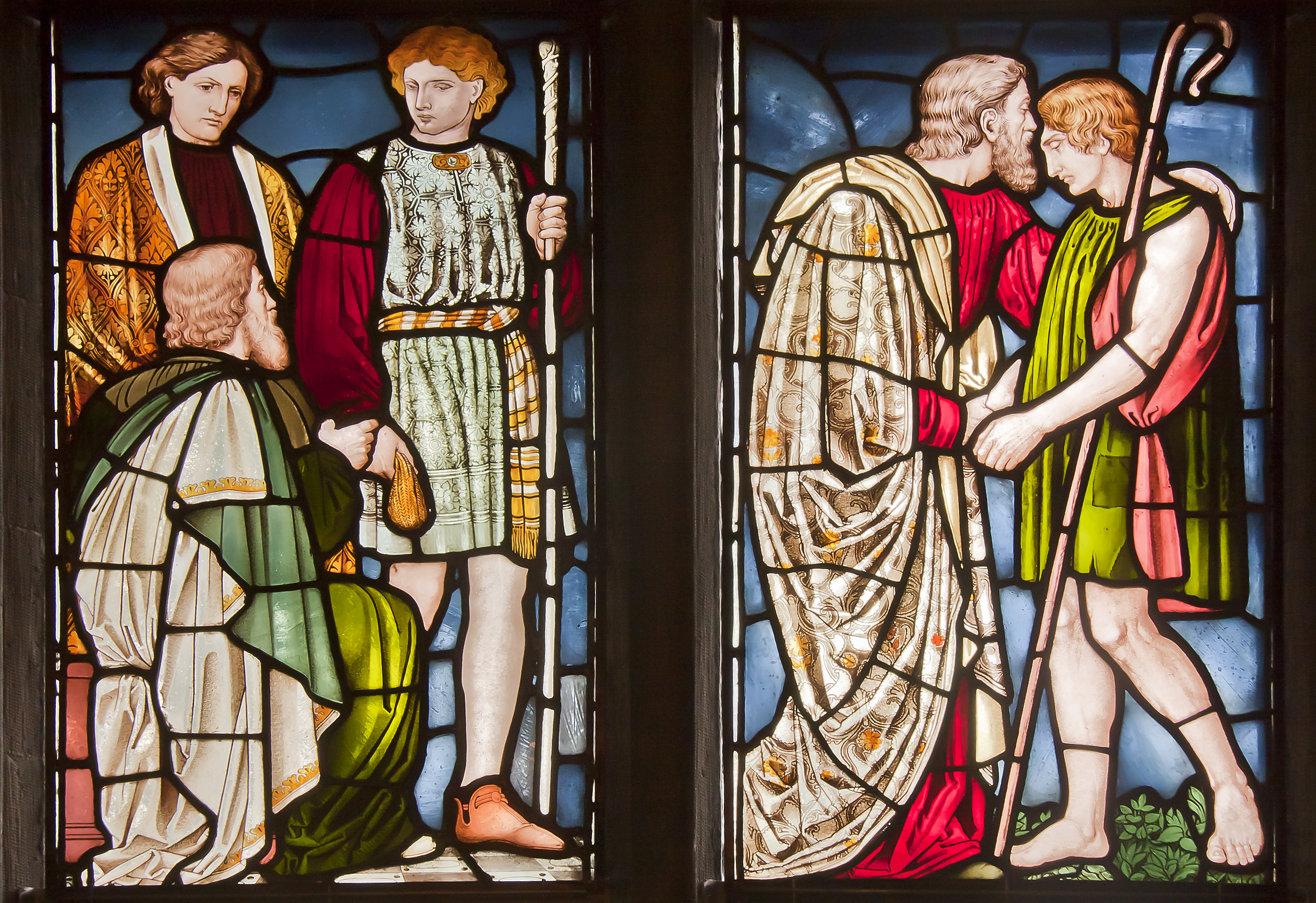
The Prodigal Son window in St. Nicholas Church, Örebro

A list of the known extant works of Carl Almquist (1848 – 1924), a Swedish-born stained-glass artist whose professional life was spent entirely in Britain. He was a pupil of Henry Holiday and became one of the two chief designers for the well-known Lancaster firm of Shrigley and Hunt. He was in large measure responsible for establishing their late Pre-Raphaelite or Aesthetic style. Though largely neglected by 20th-century art historians, Almquist has more recently been acclaimed as a genius, and as one of the leading late-Victorian stained-glass designers. Almquist designed many windows for locations in Scotland, Wales, the Home Counties, Yorkshire, and above all in the north-west of England, and there are scattered examples elsewhere.

== Works ==
Because of the destruction by fire of most of the company's records in 1973 many Shrigley and Hunt windows can be attributed to individual designers only on stylistic grounds, if at all. Any list of Carl Almquist's works is therefore necessarily incomplete. However, unless otherwise stated, all of the following Shrigley and Hunt windows have been firmly attributed to Almquist as designer.

=== Great Britain ===
==== England ====
Bedfordshire

- Bedford, St Paul's Church. First north aisle window, three lights (1884-1885). Subject: Fortitude, Faith and Charity. Edward Jenkins Prest and Edward Holmes Jewitt assisted Almquist on this window.
- Luton, St Mary's Church. Three windows in the north chapel, each of four lights (1914). Subjects: Prudence, Temperance, Fortitude, Justice, Joseph, Daniel, Judas Maccabeus, and Solomon; Love, Joy, Peace, Long Suffering, David, Miriam, Raphael, and Stephen; Faith, Meekness, Patience, Chastity, Abraham, Moses, Job and Boaz.
- Shillington, All Saints Church. East window, five lights (1885). Designed in collaboration with Edward Holmes Jewitt. Subject: the Disputation, the Crucifixion, the Ascension, and Christ blessing little children.
- Upper Stondon, All Saints Church. North transept window, three lights (1885). Subject: Faith, Hope and Charity. Waters described it as "a masterpiece that places Almquist at the centre of the Holiday – Burne-Jones school of design".

Buckinghamshire

- Steeple Claydon, St Michael's Church. A painted reredos in which the central panel, by Almquist, depicts the Resurrection, while the two side panels are by Jewitt. Waters comments that "Neither artist was most successful as a painter in oil, but this reredos is the most successful the firm was to produce."

Cambridgeshire

- Pampisford, St John the Baptist's Church. East window, three lights (1896). Subject: the Crucifixion.

Cheshire

- Dunham-on-the-Hill, St Luke's Church. East window, three lights (c. 1878). Subject: the Annunciation to the Shepherds.
- Grappenhall, St Wilfrid's Church. A north window, four lights (1887). Subject: the Adoration of the Lamb. Waters called it "a highly complex masterpiece".
- Harthill, All Saints Church. East window, six lights (1885–1887). Subject: Scenes from the Life of Christ.
- Latchford, Christ Church. East window, five lights (1887). Subject: Christ in Majesty, with angels.
- Winwick, St Oswald's Church. West window, four lights (c. 1887). Subject: the Tree of Jesse.

Cumbria

- Aldingham, St Cuthbert's Church. North window of the chancel, three lights (c. 1905). Subject: St Martin.
- Bardsea, Holy Trinity Church. West window of the north nave, two lights (1906). Subject: Jesus at the home of Martha and Mary.
- Broughton-in-Furness, St Mary Magdalene's Church. A north window of the nave, three lights (1896). Subject: the Nativity.
- Cartmel, Priory. South transept window (1899). Subject: the Adoration of the Magi.
- Crosby Ravensworth, St Lawrence's Church. South window of the chancel, three lights (1888). Subject: musical angels.
- Finsthwaite, St Peter's Church. West window, one light (1894). Subject: Christ as the Good Shepherd.
- Great Strickland, St Barnabas Church. East window, three lights (1885). Subject: the Crucifixion.
- Satterthwaite, All Saints Church. East window, two lights (1917). Subject: St George and St Michael. It is credited to Almquist and Jewitt.

Derbyshire

- Matlock, Matlock Town Hall. The stair window (1881) is in three tiers, of which the top, with floating figures, and the bottom, representing Hygeia and Aesculapius, are by Almquist.

Durham

- Redmarshall, St Cuthbert's Church. A south window, two lights (c. 1905). Subject: musical angels.

East Riding of Yorkshire

- Pocklington, All Saints Church. West window of the south transept (1896). Subject: the Annunciation and the Crucifixion. Another window, four lights (c. 1891). Subject: four archangels.

East Sussex

- East Hoathly, parish church (no dedication). East window, three lights (1884). Possibly in collaboration with Jewitt and William Tipping. Subject: Christ and the Apostles.

Greater London

- Cockfosters, Christ Church. All this church's stained glass (1898–1905) was produced by Shrigley and Hunt, and all, apart from some of the glass in the east wall sidelights, was designed by Almquist.
- South Kensington, Victoria and Albert Museum. Stained glass panels with a sunflowers and swallows motif. Previously thought to be by Selwyn Image but now attributed to Almquist.

Greater Manchester

- Bolton, St Mary's Church. A north window, four lights, and the aisle clerestory window above. Subject: an angel with a chalice, Jesus at Gethsemane, etc. By Almquist and Jewitt. It is described in the Buildings of England series as "Duskily Pre-Raphaelite, with some beautifully rich colours...a notable early work of theirs".
- Bradshaw, St Maxentius Church. East window (1896), probably by Almquist.
- Rochdale, Town Hall, Great Hall. Painting on the east wall of the signing of Magna Carta (1870). By Henry Holiday, assisted by Carl Almquist and Harry Ellis Wooldridge.

Hertfordshire

- Datchworth, All Saints Church. West window of the north aisle, two lights (1879). Subject: Sower and Reaper.
- Hoddesdon, St Catherine and St Paul's Church. East window of the south chapel (1877).
- Ware, St Mary the Virgin's Church. First window of the south aisle, three lights (1885). Subject: the early life of Christ.

Kent

- Aldington, St Martin's Church. South transept window, two lights (1887). Subject: two angels.
- Boxley, All Saints Church. West window of the north aisle, two lights (1913). Subject: St David and St James the Great. The main design is by Almquist, but the bands of Jesus stilling the tempest are by Patten Wilson.

Lancashire

- Blackpool, Holy Trinity Church. Two south windows, each of four lights (1909). Subjects: church music and church building. Waters considered these windows perhaps the finest Shrigley and Hunt ever produced.
- Bolton-le-Sands, Holy Trinity Church. West tower window, two lights (1891). Subject: guardian angel. Waters called it "spectacular".
- Fulwood, Christ Church. North window of the chancel, one light (1911). Subject: the Ascension.
- Garstang, St Thomas's Church. East window, three lights (1877). Subject: the Ascension.
- Glasson Dock, Christ Church. A north window, three lights (1889). Subject: the Good Shepherd and angels.
- Great Eccleston, St Anne's Church. East window, three lights (1884). Subject: the Crucifixion.
- Higher Walton, All Saints Church. West window, two lights (c. 1880). Subject: Scenes from the Life of Christ.
- Lancaster, Christ Church. West window (1891). Subject: Christ and Apostles. South aisle windows (1895). Subjects: Arrival of the Magi; Jairus' Daughter; Raising the Widow's Son. Another window, one light (1895). Subject: Suffer the Little Children. Another window, one light (1895). Subject: the Good Shepherd.
- Lancaster, St Peter's Cathedral. Baptistry windows (1899). Subjects: St Peter and St Paul; St Processus and St Martinian; St Philip; St Augustine of Canterbury and St Paulinus of York. West window of the south aisle (1905). Subject: the Assumption of Mary.
- Lancaster, Priory. East window of the King's Own Regiment Memorial Chapel, three lights (c. 1903). Subject: St George, St Michael, and St Alban.
- Lytham St Annes, St Anne's Church. South aisle window, three lights (c. 1899). Subject: St Agnes between two figures. Only the two figures in the left and right lights are by Almquist.
- Melling, St Wilfrid's Church. North aisle window, two lights (1887, modified by George Jonathan Hunt 1905).
- Over Wyresdale, Christ Church. All the church's windows were designed by Almquist (1891–1903) Subjects: the Good Shepherd; the Lost Sheep; the Adoration of the Shepherds; the Hireling Shepherd; David tending Jesse’s flock. The Hireling Shepherd window is described in the Buildings of England series as "outstanding".
- Preston, St George the Martyr's Church. The stained glass was designed by Almquist. He also furnished the designs for murals depicting the Exodus, and personally supervised their transfer onto the walls of the church, above the arches of the north and south walls.
- Silverdale, St John's Church. West window, three lights (1888). Subject: the Nativity. Clerestory windows (1891). Subject: Old Testament prophets. Waters considered these windows superb.
- Yealand Conyers, St John's Church. A south window, one light (1889). Subject: the Good Shepherd.

Lincolnshire

- Epworth, St Andrew's Church. South chancel window, three lights (c. 1909). Subject: After the Resurrection. North window. Subject: Christ blessing little children.

Merseyside

- Garston, St Michael's Church. Three apse windows, each of two lights (1885–1886). Subjects: Dorcas; the Last Supper; Moses.
- Great Crosby, United Reformed Church. East window. Design said to be attributed to Almquist.
- St Helens, Christ Church. Two south windows (2nd and 3rd from the west), one light each (1887). Subjects: Charity; Dorcas.
- Wallasey, St Nicholas Church. East window, five lights (1910). Subject: Vision of St John the Divine.
- West Derby, St James's Church. North chapel window, three lights (1883). Subject: Martyrs worshipping the Lamb. West window (1898). Subject: Scenes from Christ's Life. Another window (1888). Subject: Annunciation and Nativity.

Norfolk

- East Bilney, St Mary's Church. North chancel window (1886). Subject: the Resurrection.

Northamptonshire

- Higham Ferrers, St Mary's Church. South chancel, three lights (1899). Subject: Seraphim.

Northumberland

- Riding Mill, St James's Church. All five windows in the Sanctuary.

North Yorkshire

- York, St Olave's Church. Two windows (c. 1905). Subjects: St John, St Andrew, and the archangel Gabriel; Transfiguration. Another window (1902). Subject: Christ, St Luke, and Tabitha.

Nottinghamshire

- Holme Pierrepont, St Edmund's Church. A south aisle window, three lights. Subject: angels in tracery.

Oxfordshire

- Oxford, Mansfield College Chapel. West window, six lights (1889). Subject: Scenes from the Life of Christ.

South Yorkshire

- Ranmoor, St John the Evangelist's Church. Baptistry window, three lights (1888). Subject: Faith, Hope and Charity.
- Silkstone, All Saints Church. A north window, three lights (1875–1876). Subject: Christ as Light of the World. Waters notes that the window has suffered from borax decay.

Surrey

- All Saints' Church, Grayswood. East window, five lights (1905). Subject: the Ascension and Resurrection. Also a north window. In the chancel are painted figures of Moses and David on linen canvas, by Almquist according to Waters, though Historic England only says they are possibly by him.

West Yorkshire

- Bradford, St James's Church. East window, five lights (1876). Subject: Scenes from the Life of Christ.
- Ledsham, All Saints Church. East window, five lights (1899). Subject: After the Resurrection.
- Queensbury, Holy Trinity Church. A north window, two lights (1884). Subject: the Good Shepherd, and the Parable of the Talents.

Worcestershire

- Evesham, All Saints Church. Two windows, each of four lights (1899). Subjects: Saints and Prophets.

==== Scotland ====
Aberdeenshire

- Aberdeen, Kirk of St Nicholas, East Kirk. A south window, three lights (1891). Subject: Archangels.

Dunbartonshire

- Dumbarton, Town Hall. Council chamber window (1896). Subject: secular figures. The heraldry and patterns in which the figures are set are by Jewitt and others.

Lanarkshire

- Eastwood, parish church (no dedication). A south aisle window, one light (1884–1885). Subject: Mary of Bethany.

Perthshire

- Aberfoyle, parish church (no dedication). West window, two lights (1895). Subject: the Good Shepherd, and Moses.
- Aberfoyle, St Mary's Episcopal Church. East window, four lights (1896). Subject: Scenes from the Life of Christ. Waters described it as a superlative work of art.

==== Wales ====
Clwyd

- Colwyn Bay, Queens' Lodge. Landing window above the entrance (c. 1893). Subject: dancing garland weavers. Drawing room hearth tiles (1893). Subject: Perseus and Andromeda.
- Llanbedr Dyffryn Clwyd, St Peter's Church. A north window, one light (1887). Subject: Angel of martyrs.
- Llantysilio, St Tysilio's Church. West window (c. 1890?). Subject: Angels.
- Pen-y-Lan, All Saints Church. All apse windows (1888). Subjects: Christ, St John, Virgin Mary, St Peter, St Paul, St Stephen, St Ambrose, St Augustine, St David, St Alban, King David.

Dyfed

- Betws Bledrws, parish church (no dedication). East window, three lights (1886). Subject: the Crucifixion. West window, one light (1887). Subject: St Michael. Six windows, each of one light (1886). Subjects: Angels. Porch windows (1887). Subjects: Angels. Almquist's windows are described in the Buildings of Wales series as lovely, and of a delicacy reminiscent of Morris & Co., while Waters called his St Michael "magnificent".

Mid Glamorgan

- Merthyr Tydfil, St David's Church. A south window, two lights (1890). Subject: St Tydfil and St David. This window is a collaboration between Almquist and Henry Wilson.

=== Ireland ===
County Kilkenny

- Kilkenny, St Canice's Cathedral. Three south chancel windows, each of one light (1902). Subject of the central lancet: St John and St Peter. Attributed to Almquist.

=== Spain ===
==== Canary Islands ====
Tenerife

- Puerto de la Cruz, All Saints' Church. Window (1890). Subject: the Good Shepherd.

=== Sweden ===
Örebro County

- Örebro, Olaus Petri Church. South transept window, three lights. Subject: the Passion of Christ. East window, three lights. Subject: Christ in Majesty, St Peter, and St Paul. Wall decorations in the choir.
- Örebro, St Nicholas Church. A north window, three lights (1881). Subject: musical angel. East window. Subject: Scenes from the Life of Christ. South transept window. Subject: Scenes from the Life of Christ. Various other windows.

== See also ==
- Carl Almquist
- Shrigley and Hunt
