= List of public art in Ceredigion =

Ceredigion highlighted within Wales

This is a list of public art in Ceredigion, Wales. This list applies only to works of public art on permanent display in an outdoor public space and does not, for example, include artworks in museums.

== Aberaeron ==
Image	Title / subject	Location and coordinates	Date	Artist / designer	Type	Material	Dimensions	Designation	Wikidata	Notes
	Welsh cob	Aberaeron	2005	David Mayer	Equestrian statue	Bronze				

== Aberbanc ==
Image	Title / subject	Location and coordinates	Date	Artist / designer	Type	Material	Dimensions	Designation	Wikidata	Notes
	War memorial	Aberbanc	1923	E. L. Jones	Statue on pedestal	Marble statue on granite pedestal				

== Aberporth ==
Image	Title / subject	Location and coordinates	Date	Artist / designer	Type	Material	Dimensions	Designation	Wikidata	Notes
	Blaenporth & Aberporth war memorial	Hen Gapel Cemetery, Aberporth	1922	T. Jones and J. Thomas Jones	Statue on pedestal	Carrara marble statue on granite pedestal				
	Dolphin	Aberporth	2001	Paul Clarke	Sculpture	Wood with stone support				

== Aberystwyth ==
Image	Title / subject	Location and coordinates	Date	Artist / designer	Type	Material	Dimensions	Designation	Wikidata	Notes
	The Pendinas Column or Wellington Monument	Pendinas Hillfort, Penparcau, Aberystwyth	c. 1858	W. E. Richards	Tapered column	Stone	18m high	Grade II	Q29489050	
	Archimedes	Old College, Aberystwyth	c. 1887–1889	C. F. A. Voysey	Mosaic triptych	Stone				
More images	Edward VII	Ceredigion Museum, Aberystwyth	1904		Statue	Terracotta		Grade II		One of three identical statues in Aberystwyth.
	Gorsedd stones	Aberystwyth Castle	1916		Circle of monoliths	Stone				Marks site of 1916 National Eisteddfod of Wales
	War memorial	Tabernacle Chapel, Powell Street, Aberystwyth	1921	Mario Rutelli	Statue on plinth	Bronze and marble		Grade II	Q29489007	
More images	Thomas Charles Edwards	Old College, Aberystwyth	1922	Goscombe John	Statue on pedestal	Bronze statue on granite pedestal		Grade II	Q29488944	
More images	Edward VIII as Prince of Wales	Old College, Aberystwyth	1922	Mario Rutelli	Statue on pedestal	Bronze and marble		Grade II	Q29488945	
More images	Aberystwyth War Memorial	Aberystwyth	1923	Mario Rutelli	Tapered column with statues of Victory & Humanity	Stone and bronze figures	21m high	Grade II	Q24662508	
	Thomas Edward Ellis	Old College, Aberystwyth		Goscombe John	Statue on pedestal	Bronze and stone				Copy of an original at Bala, Gwynedd

== Betws Bledrws ==
Image	Title / subject	Location and coordinates	Date	Artist / designer	Type	Material	Dimensions	Designation	Wikidata	Notes
	Derry Ormond Tower	Near Betws Bledrws	1821–1824	Charles Robert Cockerell, Charles James and David Morgan (builder)	Column on pedestal	Stone	39m high	Grade II*	Q17744011	

== Borth ==
Image	Title / subject	Location and coordinates	Date	Artist / designer	Type	Material	Dimensions	Designation	Wikidata	Notes
More images	War memorial	Cliff above Craig yr Wylfa, Borth			Plinth, pedestal, column & cross	Limestone	6m high	Grade II	Q29496591	

== Cardigan ==
Image	Title / subject	Location and coordinates	Date	Artist / designer	Type	Material	Dimensions	Designation	Wikidata	Notes
	War memorial	Victoria Gardens, Cardigan	1923	Mr Boadle and D. S. Jenkins	Cenotaph	Granite	4.5m high	Grade II	Q29489120	
	Gorsedd stones	Cardigan			Standing circle	Stone				Erected to mark the National Eisteddfod of Wales
	Eisteddfod of 1176	Cardigan			Plaque and standing stone					

== Cellan ==
Image	Title / subject	Location and coordinates	Date	Artist / designer	Type	Material	Dimensions	Designation	Wikidata	Notes
	War memorial	Cellan, near Lampeter			Oberlisk on pedestal	Marble and stone	1.5m high			

== Lampeter ==
Image	Title / subject	Location and coordinates	Date	Artist / designer	Type	Material	Dimensions	Designation	Wikidata	Notes
	Harford Fountain	Harford Square, Lampeter	1862, restored 1990		Obelisk & drinking fountain	Stone		Grade II	Q17512521	
More images	War memorial	Bryn Square, Lampeter	1921	Goscombe John and Llewllyn Bankes-Price	Statue on pedestal and raised terrace	Bronze statue, granite pedestal	4.5m high	Grade II	Q29489055	

== Llangeitho ==
Image	Title / subject	Location and coordinates	Date	Artist / designer	Type	Material	Dimensions	Designation	Wikidata	Notes
More images	Daniel Rowland	Bryn Mair, Llangeitho	1883	Edward Owen Griffith	Statue on pedestal	Marble	1.68m high (without pedestal)	Grade II	Q29488592	
	War memorial	The Square, Llangeitho	1923	E. Jones	Statue on pedestal	Marble		Grade II	Q29496461	

== Llanbadarn Fawr ==
Image	Title / subject	Location and coordinates	Date	Artist / designer	Type	Material	Dimensions	Designation	Wikidata	Notes
More images	War memorial	Primrose Hill, Llanbadarn Fawr	1921	Richard Davies, R. L. Gapper, W. A. Miller and the sisters James	Celtic cross on pedestal	Granite		Grade II	Q29503909	

== Llangrannog ==
Image	Title / subject	Location and coordinates	Date	Artist / designer	Type	Material	Dimensions	Designation	Wikidata	Notes
More images	Saint Carannog	Llangrannog	2012	Sebastien Boyesen	Statue	Bronze			Q115562451	
	Sarah Jane Rees, known as Cranogwen	Llangrannog	2023	Sebastien Boyesen	Statue	Bronze				

== Pen-llwyn ==
Image	Title / subject	Location and coordinates	Date	Artist / designer	Type	Material	Dimensions	Designation	Wikidata	Notes
	Lewis Edwards memorial	Pen-llwyn	1911	Goscombe John	Bust on pedestal	Bronze and granite		Grade II	Q29501128	

== Tregaron ==
Image	Title / subject	Location and coordinates	Date	Artist / designer	Type	Material	Dimensions	Designation	Wikidata	Notes
More images	Henry Richard	Tregaron	1893	Albert Toft	Statue on pedestal	Bronze statue, granite pedestal	5.5m high	Grade II	Q29495968	
