= Derry Ormond Tower =

Building in Ceredigion, Wales

Coordinates: 52°08′43″N 4°03′44″W

Derry Ormond Tower is a Grade II*-listed folly situated above Betws Bledrws, 3 miles (4.8 km) north of Lampeter in the county of Ceredigion, Wales. It was built in the early nineteenth century as an unemployment relief project. The tower forms an eyecatcher within a landscaped park attached to the, now demolished, Derry Ormond House. The park is listed on the Cadw/ICOMOS Register of Parks and Gardens of Special Historic Interest in Wales.

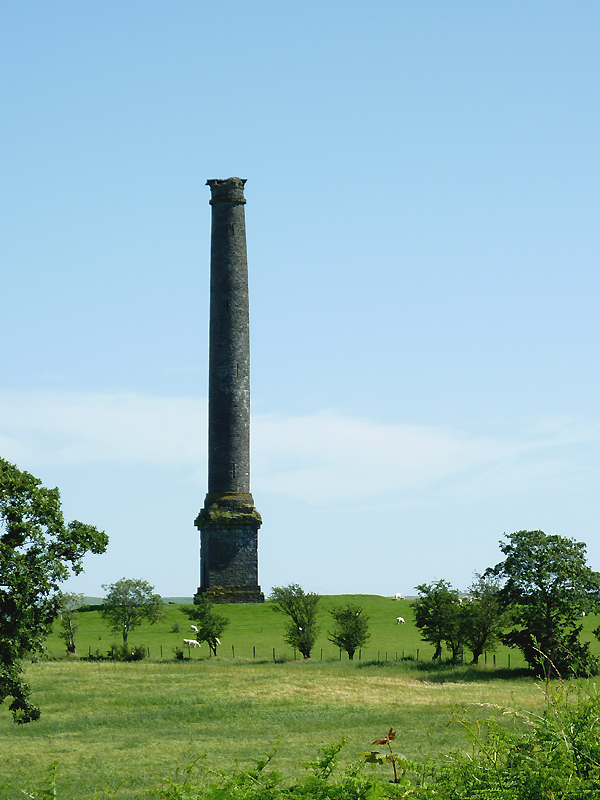
Derry Ormond Tower, Betws Bledrws.

== History ==
The tower was designed by C. R. Cockerell who also designed Derry Ormond House, funded by John Jones of the Derry Ormond estate, and built by local unemployed men between 1821 and 1824. The project was overseen by a local builder named David Morgan. His gravestone in the churchyard of Betws Bledrws church describes him as "the contractor and builder of the Derry Ormond Tower".

While originally it was named "St David's Pillar", in the historic Ordnance Survey mapping of 1888 it was referred to by its present name (which refers to the locality of Derry Ormond).

== Conservation ==
The tower was Grade II* listed on 28 February 1952 "as one of the most prominent romantic monuments in the region, of which the Pendinas Column of 1853 at Aberystwyth is the only other of similar form." Despite being renovated by D. B. Hague in the 1970s, the tower has since fallen into disrepair. The entrance has been bricked up, with only a small hole allowing access to the ground floor, while the stairs are precarious with a gap approximately ten feet up that prevents further access.

The park surrounding the tower is designated Grade II on the Cadw/ICOMOS Register of Parks and Gardens of Special Historic Interest in Wales.

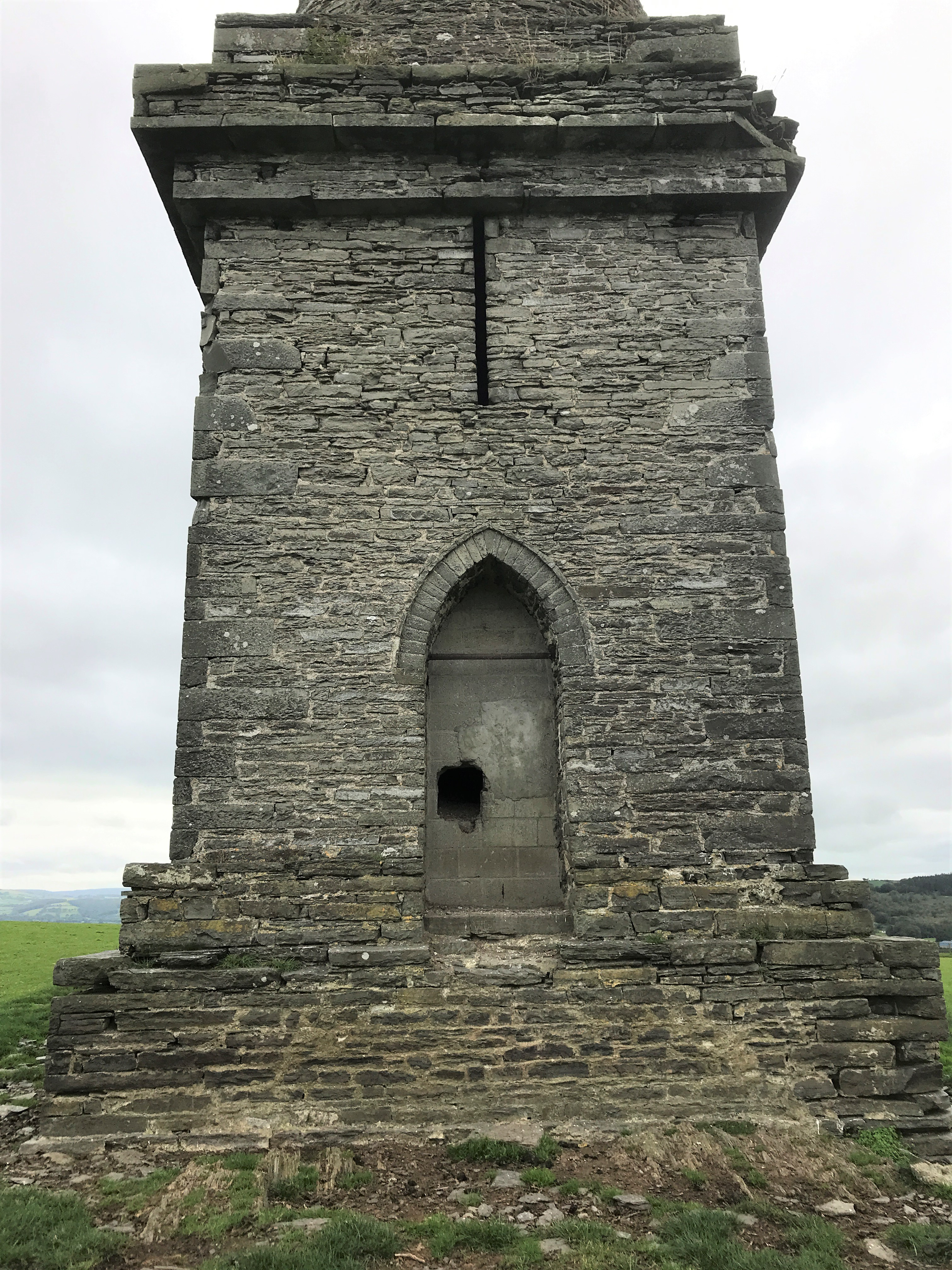
Derry Ormond Tower front entrance, 2019

== Description ==
The 127-foot-high (38.7 m) tower, which is based on an upturned cannon, was built on common land near Derry Ormond. The pedestal of the column is built of coursed square rubble stone, 8.3 metres (27 ft) high and 4.3 metres (14 ft) wide. The column itself is 31.4 metres (103 ft) high and has a square plinth and a rounded base 3.8 metres (12 ft) in diameter. The column swells in the middle and has a neck ring and a now-eroded band of corbels at its top. Apparently it was surmounted by a viewing platform, but is now covered by slate slabs and consolidated in concrete. The stairway to the top had narrow loops to admit light through the shafts.
