= List of works by Edward Holmes Jewitt =

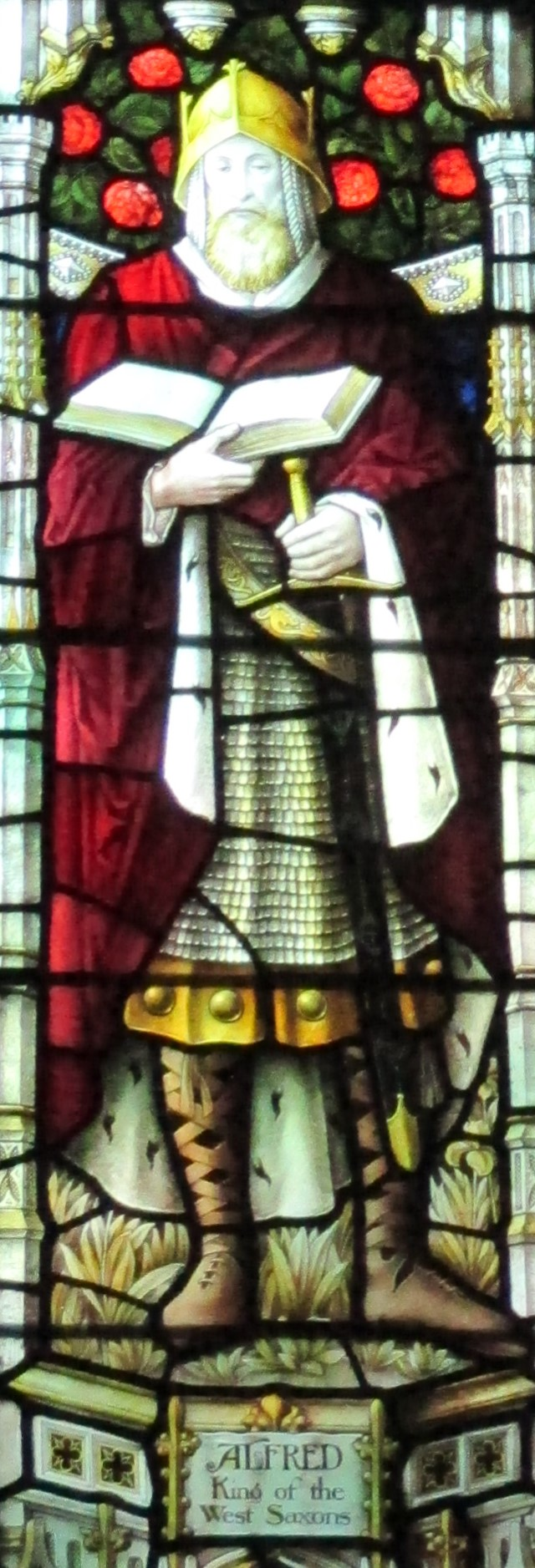
Detail of the King Alfred window in Lancaster Priory

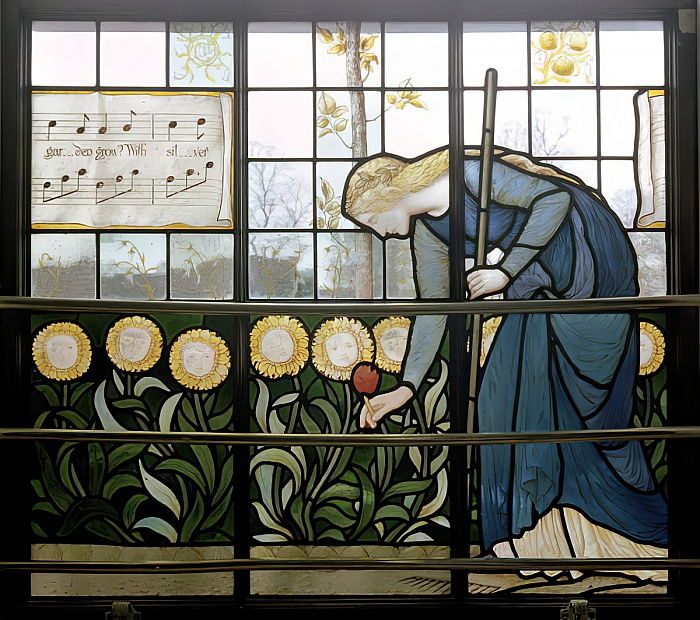
Domestic stained-glass window in Pownall Hall Farm, Wilmslow, Cheshire

A list of the known extant works of Edward Holmes Jewitt (1849 – 1929), a Pre-Raphaelite artist working in stained glass and other media. He was one of the two chief designers, along with Carl Almquist, for the Lancaster firm of Shrigley and Hunt, producers of stained glass windows and church-fittings. In recent years his work has begun to be studied and admired, though claims that he was a genius have not gone uncontested. Jewitt designed many windows for locations in the Home Counties, Yorkshire, and above all the north-west of England, and there are scattered examples elsewhere.

== Works ==
Because of the destruction by fire of most of the company's records in 1973 many Shrigley and Hunt windows can be attributed to individual designers only on stylistic grounds, if at all. Any list of E. H. Jewitt's works is therefore necessarily incomplete. However, unless otherwise stated, all of the following Shrigley and Hunt windows have been firmly attributed to Jewitt as designer.

=== England ===
Bedfordshire

- Bedford, St Paul's Church. First north aisle window, three lights (1884–1885). Subject: Fortitude, Faith and Charity. The figures are by Carl Almquist, the background patterns by E. H. Jewitt.
- Shillington, All Saints Church. East window, five lights (1885). Designed in collaboration with Almquist. Subject: the Disputation, the Crucifixion, the Ascension, and Christ blessing little children.

Buckinghamshire

- Steeple Claydon, St Michael's Church. A painted reredos in which the central panel, by Almquist, depicts the Resurrection, while the two side panels are by Jewitt. Waters comments that "Neither artist was most successful as a painter in oil, but this reredos is the most successful the firm was to produce."

Cheshire

- Thelwall, All Saints Church. East window, three lights. Subject: Nathaniel, Jesus as the Good Shepherd, and Joseph of Arimathea.
- Walton, St John's Church. East window, four lights (1883). Subject: Te Deum. West window: three lights, side windows (1881). Subject: angels. Another window. Subject: the Last Supper. Several other windows.
- Wilmslow, Pownall Hall. Many stained-glass windows (c. 1886).
- Wilmslow, St Bartholomew's Church. A south window, four lights (1925). Subject: angels and musicians praising God. Designed in collaboration with Charles Frederick Turner. Waters thought this window outstanding.

Cumbria

- Bardsea, Holy Trinity Church. A north window of the nave, two lights (1883). Subject: young men and women.
- Barrow-in-Furness, Town Hall. Staircase window (1893). Produced in collaboration with E. L. Eaton. Waters called this window "magnificent".
- Cartmel, Priory. Several windows (1885–1899).
- Crosby Ravensworth, St Lawrence's Church. Window (c. 1878). Subject: the Annunciation.
- Satterthwaite, All Saints Church. East window, two lights (1917). Subject: St George and St Michael. It is credited to Almquist and Jewitt.
- Windermere, St Mary's Church. West window of the south aisle, two lights (1879). Subject: Moses and Christ.

Derbyshire

- Matlock, Matlock Town Hall. Side panels of the stair window (1881). The fish decoration only is Jewitt's.

Devon

- Alverdiscott, All Saints Church. East window, three lights (1879). The figures are by William Tipping, the vine background is Jewitt's.
- North Bovey, St John the Baptist's Church. East window, three lights (1880). Subject: angels adoring Christ in Majesty.

East Sussex

- East Hoathly, parish church (no dedication). East window, three lights (1884). Usually credited to Almquist, but Waters sees Jewitt's hand in the tracery angels and one of the apostles. Subject: Christ and the Apostles.

Gloucestershire

- Stanton, St Michael's Church. First window of the north aisle, three lights (1896). Subject: St Anne, St John, St Mary Magdalene. Second window of the north aisle, (1896). Subject: the archangels Michael and Gabriel.

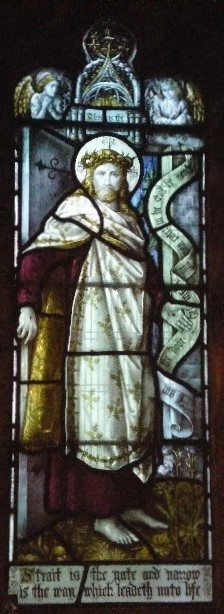
The Christ at the Door window in Christ Church, Lancaster, Lancashire

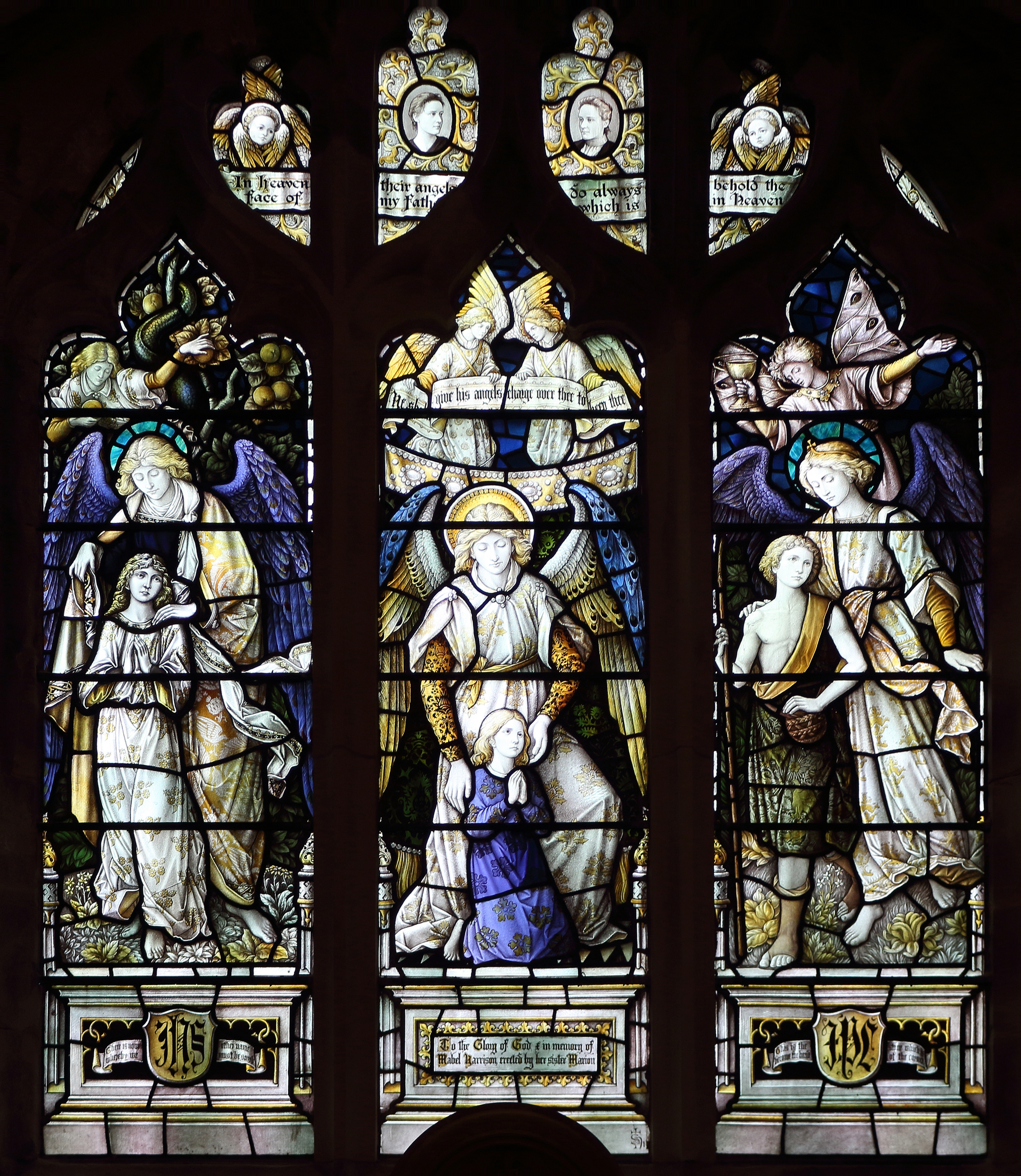
The Guardian Angel window in the Lady Chapel of St Nicholas Church, Wallasey, Merseyside

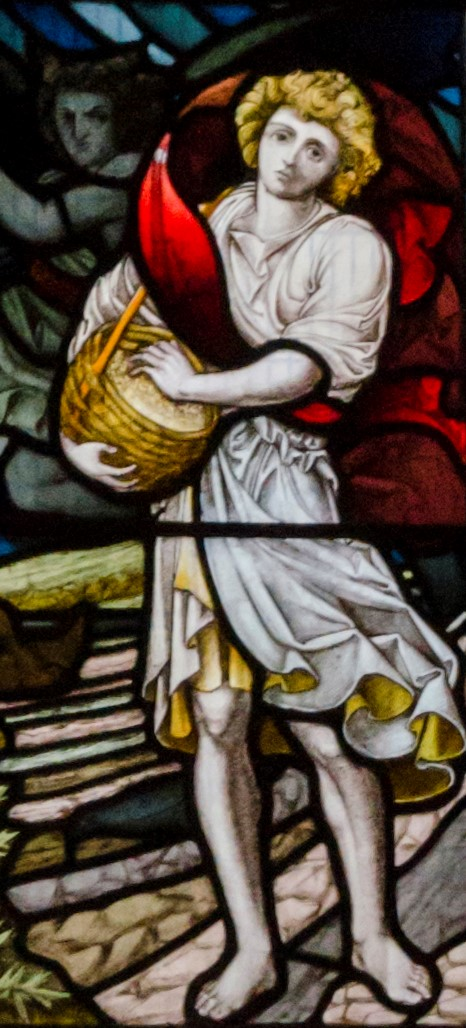
Detail of the Sower and Reaper window in St Peter and St Paul's Church, Pickering, North Yorkshire

Greater London

- Cockfosters, Christ Church. Some of the glass in the east wall sidelights.

Greater Manchester

- Bolton, St Mary's Church. A north window, four lights, and the aisle clerestory window above. Subject: an angel with a chalice, Jesus at Gethsemane, etc. By Almquist and Jewitt. It is described in the Buildings of England series as "Duskily Pre-Raphaelite, with some beautifully rich colours...a notable early work of theirs".
- Hindley, All Saints Church. East window (1878). Subject: the Ascension. Waters comments that "Jewitt's refined drawing and intricate detail is used with great effect, and his complex design retains its clarity in spite of the proliferation of images."
- Leigh, St Mary's Church. East window, five lights (1888). Subject: Christ and archangels. East wall of St Mary's chapel, three lights (1882). Subject: Nunc Dimittis.

Hertfordshire

- Hertford, All Saints Church. East window of the south chapel, four lights. Subject: the Four Evangelists (according to Waters), or SS Stephen, Peter, Paul, and Matthew (according to Robert Eberhard).
- Ware, St Mary the Virgin's Church. Second window of the south aisle. Subject: the Finding in the Temple, the Baptism of Jesus, Jesus delivered by angels from temptation, the Calling of the disciples.

Lancashire

- Accrington St John's Church. West window, four lights (1884). Subject: Christ in Majesty. Waters notes that it has been damaged by vandalism.
- Garstang, St Thomas's Church. Reredos (c. 1877). Subject: angels.
- Glasson Dock, Christ Church. A south window, three lights (1893). Subject: Christ, St John, and St Paul.
- Great Eccleston, St Anne's Church. A window (1884). Subject: St Thomas.
- Higher Walton, All Saints Church. East window, two lights (1882). Subject: Christ blessing little children, Baptism of Jesus.
- Hornby, St Margaret's Church. Reredos (c. 1888). Subject: the Nativity.
- Lancaster, Christ Church. A south window, two lights (1896). Subject: River of Paradise. Another window, one light (1895). Subject: Christ at the Door. Waters called it "the most dramatic and telling of Jewitt's designs".
- Lancaster, Priory, King's Own Regiment Memorial Chapel. East window (to left), two lights (c. 1910). Subject: Alfred the Great and St Oswald. East window (to right), two lights (c. 1910). Subject: St Martin and St Longinus. West window, four lights (c. 1910). Subject: four prophets.
- Lancaster, The Storey. First floor corridor windows.
- Lytham St Annes, St Anne's Church. South aisle window, three lights (c. 1899). Subject: St Agnes between two figures. Only the figure in the central light is by Jewitt.
- Oswaldtwistle, St Paul's Church. East window, five lights (1884). Subject: the Crucifixion. Waters wrote that "This extraordinary window is unique in the output of the firm, in its stark, uncompromising idiom. Almost Expressionist both in the treatment of the subject and in the choice of streaky glass."
- Pilling, St John the Baptist's Church. A north nave window (1911). Subject: St Margaret.
- Quernmore, St Peter's Church. A south window, two lights (1881). Subject: angels. Waters thought it one of Jewitt's most powerful windows.

Leicestershire

- Burbage, St Catherine's Church. A south window, three lights (1894). Subject: the life of Hezekiah. Waters called this "almost surreal", and "a minor masterpiece".
- Gilmorton, All Saints Church. East window, three lights (1896). Subject: the Ascension.

Lincolnshire

- Epworth, St Andrew's Church. A north window (1884). Subject: the raising of Jairus' daughter.

Merseyside

- Newton-le-Willows, St Peter's Church. West window, four lights (1898–1901). Subject: Asaph and Solomon. East window (1892).
- Wallasey, St Nicholas Church. South transept window, four lights (1915). Subject: Christ preaching from a boat. A north chapel window, three lights. Subject: Guardian angels.
- West Derby, St James's Church. Two windows in the west wall of the north transept, each of two lights (1883). Subject: angels.

Norfolk

- East Bilney, St Mary's Church. A north chancel window. Subject: Christ healing children.

Northamptonshire

- Higham Ferrers, St Mary's Church. A south aisle window (1897). Subject: Hymn of the Last Supper.

North Yorkshire

- Great Ouseburn, St Mary's Church. West window, one light (c. 1884). Subject: Christ as the Good Shepherd.
- Pickering, St Peter and St Paul's Church. North transept window, two lights (1878). Subject: Sower and Reaper.
- Scarborough, St James with Holy Trinity Church. A south window, four lights (1901). Subject: St Alban, etc.
- York, St Olave's Church. Two north windows, each of three lights (1889–1891). Subject: Saints.

Nottinghamshire

- Holme Pierrepont, St Edmund's Church. Window (1891). Subject: Holy Matrons.

Suffolk

- Ipswich, All Saints Church. Painted panels of the reredos (1895–1896).

West Yorkshire

- Halifax, St John's Church. Window above porch, three lights (1883). Subject: Elijah in the Wilderness. Clerestory windows (1883). Subject: the Apostles.
- Queensbury, Holy Trinity Church. East window, five lights (1884). Subject: the Ascension and Resurrection.

=== Scotland ===
Dunbartonshire

- Dumbarton, Town Hall. Council chamber window (1896). Subject: secular figures. The figures are by Almquist, and the heraldry and patterns in which the figures are set are by Jewitt and others.

Midlothian

- Penicuik, Episcopal Church. Window, one light (1896). Subject: St George. Window, one light (1900). Subject: St Alban. Window, one light (c.1903). Subject: St Patrick.
