= Kathryn Jenkins =

Welsh hymnologist (1961–2009)

- Born: 9 June 1961; Tonypandy, Wales
- Died: 3 May 2009 (aged 47); Llangybi, Ceredigion, Wales
- Education: Aberystwyth University
- Occupation: Hymnologist
- Spouse: Alan Jones (m. 1993)
- Parents: Clement Jenkins (father); Marion Jenkins (mother)

Kathryn Jenkins (9 June 1961 – 3 May 2009) was a scholar of Welsh language and culture, especially local hymnology. She was also a hymn writer in Welsh.

== Life ==
Kathryn Jenkins was born in Tonypandy, Wales, the only child of Clement Jenkins, engineer, and Marion Jenkins. Although her parents spoke only a little Welsh, they were active members of Bethania, the Presbyterian church in Llwynypia, where Welsh was spoken and where Kathryn first learned about Welsh hymnological tradition, the subject of her life's work.

=== Education ===
Jenkins was enrolled in the local Tonypandy grammar school in 1972 and left in 1979 having gained A level certificates in music, having become a skilled pianist and organist. At Aberystwyth University, she graduated in 1982 with a first-class degree in Welsh and immediately thereafter, having received a British Academy research scholarship, Jenkins became a research student at the same university, working there from 1982–1985.

She worked briefly as sub-warden of Coleg Trefeca, which is the lay center of the Presbyterian Church of Wales, after which she returned to Aberystwyth as a research fellow in 1988. Then she accepted the position of lecturer in Welsh at St David's University College in Lampeter. In 1999, Jenkins joined the staff of the new Welsh Parliament (Senedd), first becoming the deputy editor of the Record of Discussions and then Committee Clerk, a position she still held when she died suddenly in 2009.

Jenkins became known as a literary historian and a knowledgeable literary critic who published widely on 19th- and 20th-century literature, but her most frequent subject was the 'classical' hymnody of the Welsh language and the work of William Williams of Pantycelyn, who is considered Wales's premier hymnist. His importance to the history of Welsh hymns was the subject of her PhD thesis. Jenkins went on to publish a wealth of articles describing many aspects of Pantycelyn's work.

=== Other positions ===
In addition to her professional duties, Jenkins was named a lay preacher in her church and was elected a church elder in 1986. In 1993, she was invested in the "white robes of the Gorsedd of Bards," an organization that promotes Welsh literary scholarship and the creation of poetry and music. Jenkins also became a member of the Court of the University of Wales in 1996 and joined the University's Board of Celtic Studies. She also served as president of the Presbyterian Church of Wales's board of education and President of Coleg y Bala (Bala college) 1993–1998. She also had other interests, according to Roberts,

But there is no doubt that the offices that gave her most satisfaction, and where she made her most important contribution, were those that she held at various times in the Welsh Hymn Society, as publicity officer, secretary, Treasurer 1992-98, and an innovative President from 1998 until her death... She was also a member of the executive of the British and Irish Hymn Society 1998-2004 and lectured at the conference of the International Hymn Society in Halifax, Nova Scotia, in 2003.

=== Personal life ===
Jenkins married Alan Jones in 1993; they had no children. She died suddenly at her home in Llangybi, Ceredigion, on 3 May 2009 at age 47. Her funeral took place at Maesyffynnon chapel, Llangybi, on 11 May.

== Selected publications ==
- A list of her publications in Bulletin of the Welsh Hymn Society, IV, 3-4
  - Bulletin of the Hymn Society of Great Britain and Ireland, 26 (2009)
  - Opinion, June 2009
  - Y Goleuad, 19 June 2009
  - The Anchor, August 2009
  - Introduction to the Song of the Faith: essays on hymnology (2011)
- Jenkins, Kathryn. Yr Emyn a Williams Pantycelyn: Astudiaeth. Aberystwyth, 1987. Print.
- Jenkins, Kathryn. Anthem Angau Calfari: Myfyrdodau Ar Ddetholiad O Emynau Pantycelyn. Caernarfon: Pwyllgor Darlleniadau Beiblaidd Cyngor Eglwysi Cymru, 1991. Print.
- Kathryn Jenkins, “Redefining the hymn: The performative context,” HSGBI Occasional Paper, Ser. 3, No. 4 (Dec. 2010).
- Jenkins, Kathryn, and Rhidian Griffiths. Cân y Ffydd: Ysgrifau ar Emynyddiaeth. Caernarfon: Cymdeithas Emynau Cymru mewn cydweithrediad â Gwasg y Bwthyn, 2011. Print.
