= Matlock Town Hall =

Municipal building in Matlock, Derbyshire, England

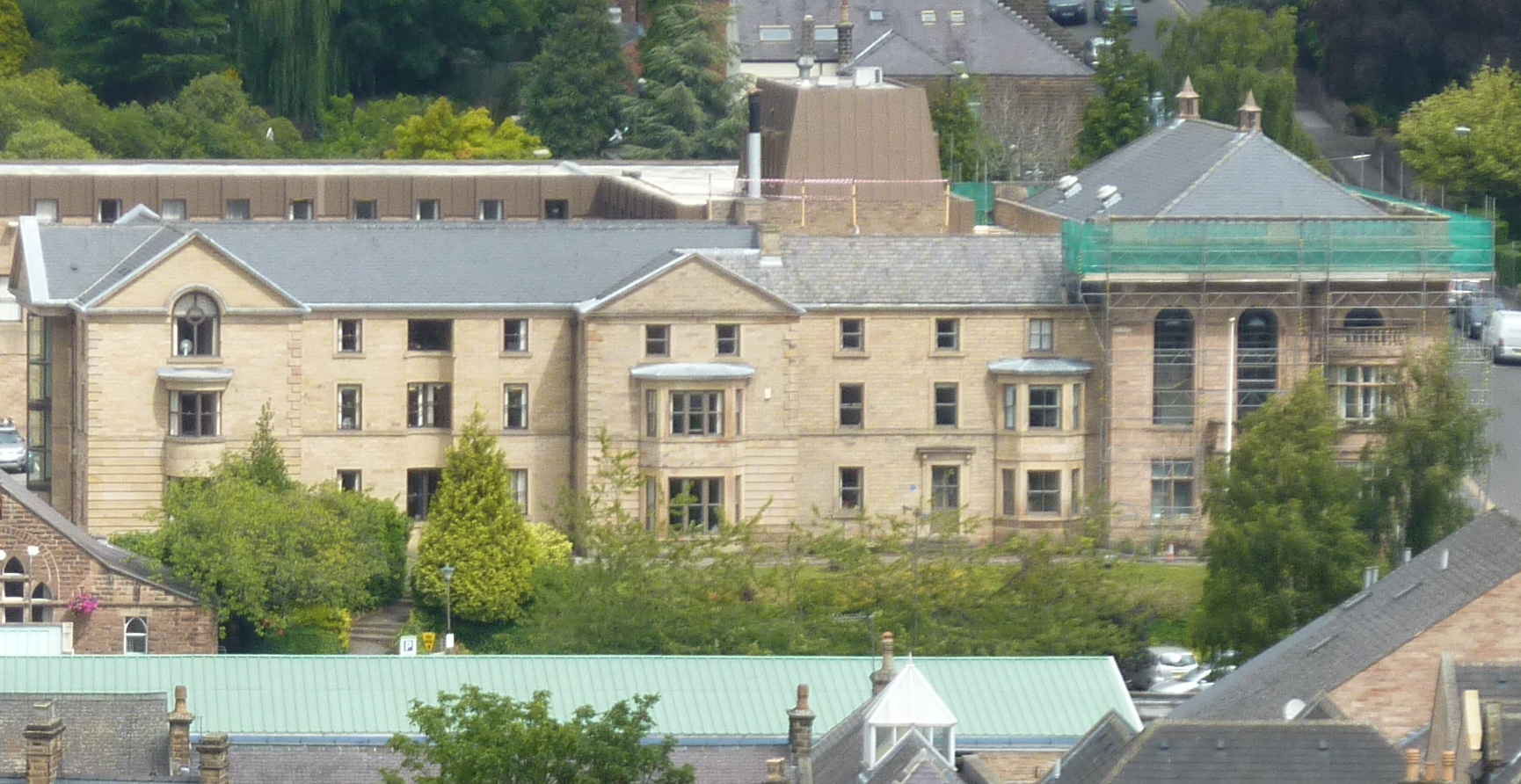
- Matlock Town Hall (the central gabled section and the three bay section to the right are formed by Bridge House which was completed c.1850; the gabled section on the far right is the Italianate block of 1898, while the three bay section to the left and the gabled block on the far left are modern)

- Shown in Derbyshire
- 53.1395°N 1.5544°W
- Location: Bank Road, Matlock

History
- Built: c.1850

Site notes
- Architectural styles: Neoclassical style and Italianate style

Matlock Town Hall is a municipal building in Bank Road, Matlock, Derbyshire, England. The building is now used as the offices of Derbyshire Dales District Council.

== History ==
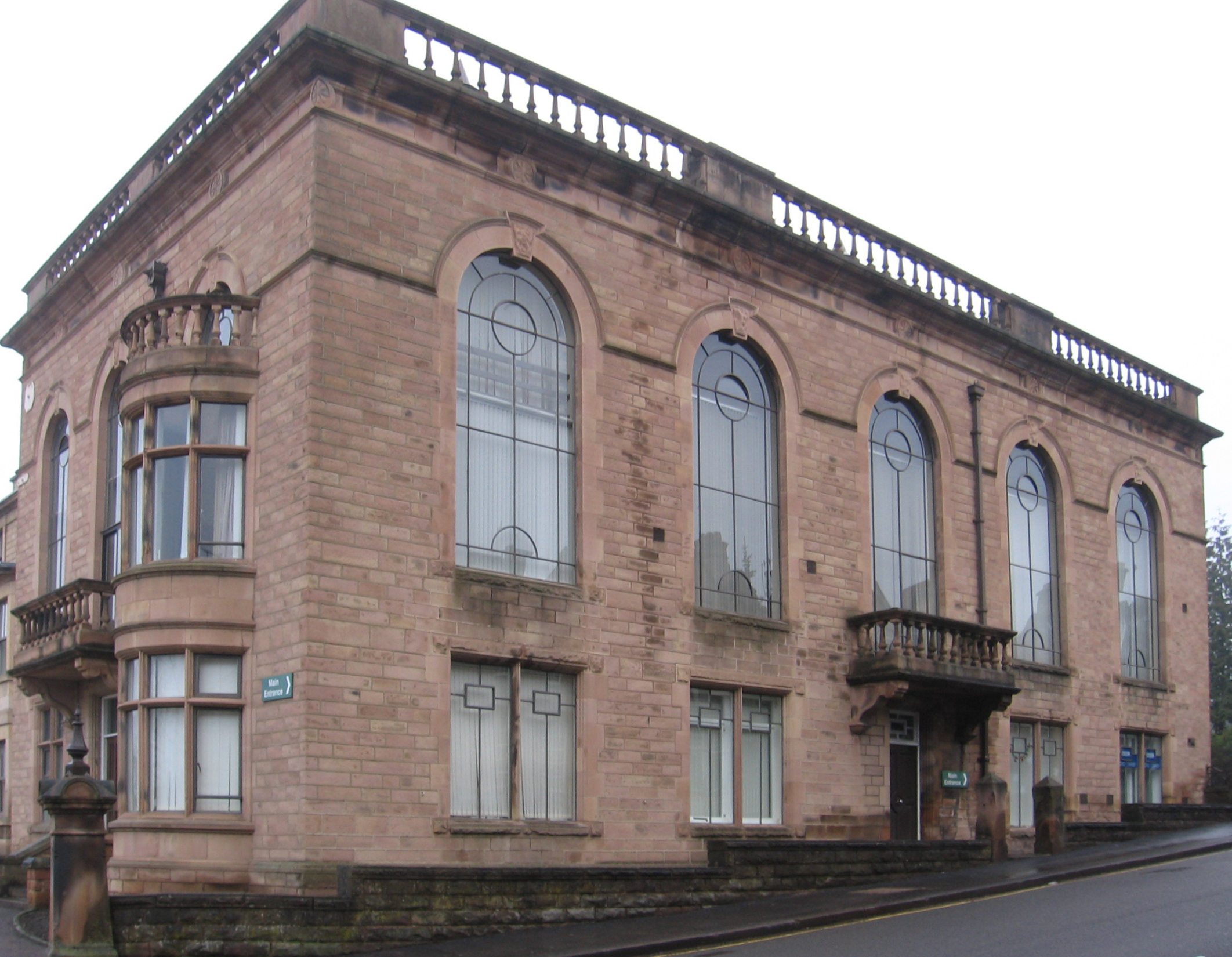
The Bank Road elevation of the Italianate block

The oldest part of the town hall complex is Bridge House, a private residence which was significantly enlarged and enhanced for a surgeon, Dr Josiah Cash, in the mid-19th century. The design involved an asymmetrical main frontage with four bays facing south towards Imperial Road; the left hand bay, which projected forward and was gabled, featured bay windows on the first two floors and two small windows on the second floor. The three bay section to the right featured a doorway in the central bay and bay windows on the first two floors in the right hand bay; the rest of that section was fenestrated by sash windows. There were formal gardens in front of the house.

Cash established a hydrotherapy business in the house, in partnership with his father-in-law, Dr John Adams, who was also a surgeon. After Cash died in October 1877, the hydrotherapy business was acquired by the Reverend Richard Nicholson, who renamed the house Bridge Hall. Nicholson commissioned a stained glass window for the staircase with panels by Carl Almquist and Edward Jewitt. When Nicholson got into financial difficulties in March 1894, his properties were auctioned in June 1894 and the local board of health acquired Bridge Hall for municipal use: a fire station was established in the stables behind the house.

Following significant population growth, largely associated with the status of Matlock as an emerging spa resort, the area became an urban district with the town hall as its offices in December 1894. The new civic leaders decided to commission an extension to the right of the original house: the design involved a large gabled block, which was designed in the Italianate style, built in ashlar stone and was completed in 1898. The design involved five bays facing Bank Road: there was a doorway in the central bay flanked by brackets supporting a stone balcony on the ground floor, five large round headed windows with keystones on the first floor and, at roof level, there was a balustrade. Internally, the principal room in the Italianate block was a large assembly hall but the enlarged complex also incorporated a courtroom for magistrates' court hearings.

At the start of the First World War, Frederick Charles Arkwright of Willersley Castle spoke at a recruiting event at the town hall in August 1914: some 50 men signed up for service with the Sherwood Foresters during the meeting. During the Second World War, William Cavendish, Marquess of Hartington, spoke to a crowd assembled outside the town hall after losing the West Derbyshire by-election, as the official candidate of the Wartime Coalition, on 18 February 1944. Standing next to his fiancé, Kathleen, (Note: Kathleen was a sister of the future President of the United States, John F. Kennedy.) and knowing he was about to go off to war, he told them, that "I am going to fight for you at the front".

The town hall continued to serve as the headquarters of Matlock Urban District Council for much of the 20th century and remained the local seat of government for the enlarged West Derbyshire District Council which was formed in 1974. In the context of the increasing responsibilities of the council, the new civic leaders decided to commission an extension to the left of the original house: the design involved a three bay section to the left and a gabled block on the far left, all in a similar style to the original building, with the works being completed in 1979. The council was renamed Derbyshire Dales District Council in 1987.
