= River Dulas =

River in Ceredigion, Wales

Coordinates: 52.1083°N 4.0742°W

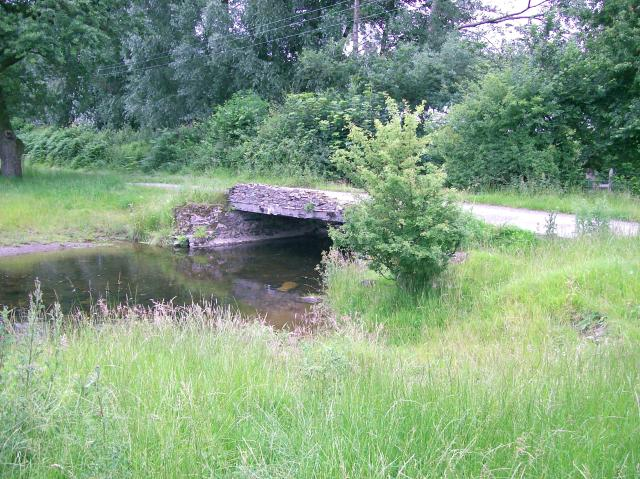
Bridge over the Dulas near Lampeter

The River Dulas (Welsh: Afon Dulas) is a tributary of the River Teifi and has its source near the village of Llangybi, Ceredigion, Wales. Its confluence with the Teifi is near Lampeter.

In June 2017, effluent from an anaerobic digestion plant in Lampeter was discharged into the Dulas. This caused a pollution incident that was investigated by Natural Resources Wales.
