= Elisabeth Inglis-Jones =

Welsh novelist and biographer (1900–1994)

Portrait of Inglis-Jones taken from a painting by Cecil Jameson

Elisabeth Inglis-Jones (1900–1994) was a Welsh historical novelist, local historian and biographer. Starved Fields (1929) was the first of six historical novels she published. She was also noted as a writer of local history and biography. Her novel Crumbling Pageant reappeared in 2015.

== Biography ==
Born in January 1900 in London, Inglis-Jones was raised in the village of Derry Ormond, now in the county of Ceredigion, on the Derry Ormond Estate, which her family had owned since 1783. The house was demolished in 1953.

Inglis-Jones moved back to the London area around 1937. In her late 80s, she was living in Camberley, Surrey.

== Literary career ==
Inglis-Jones took up writing as a child, joining a literary group called The Scratch Society when she was 12 or 13. She spent almost three years writing her first novel, Starved Fields, which was published in 1929. Her often reprinted Peacocks in Paradise (1950, republished 1990) tells of Hafod, a historic Welsh mansion, and its first owner Thomas Johnes (1748–1815). Her five other novels were Crumbling Pageant (1932, republished 2015), Pay Thy Pleasure (1939), The Loving Heart (1942), Lightly He Journeyed (1946), and Aunt Albinia (1948).

Her works on Welsh history included The Story of Wales (1955), describing houses demolished since 1900. Among her biographies was The Great Maria (1959), about the writer Maria Edgeworth, The Lord of Burghley (1964) on William Cecil, 1st Baron Burghley and Augustus Smith of Scilly (1964) on the 19th-century proprietor of the Isles of Scilly.

Jane Bowden, reviewing a revival of Crumbling Pageant, praised Inglis-Jones's "undeniable talent for story-telling, characterisation and lifelong passion for Wales", qualifying her as a "great Welsh woman writer".

== Selected works ==
=== Novels ===
- Inglis-Jones, Elisabeth (2015). Crumbling Pageant. Honno Limited. ISBN 978-1-909983-35-9.
- Jones, Elizabeth Inglis (1929). Starved Fields. Constable.

=== Welsh history ===
- Inglis-Jones, Elisabeth (1990). Peacocks in Paradise. Gomer Press. ISBN 978-0-86383-672-5.
- Inglis-Jones, Elisabeth (1959). The Great Maria: A Portrait of Maria Edgeworth. Faber & Faber.
- Inglis-Jones, Elisabeth (1964). The Lord of Burghley. Faber & Faber. ISBN 9787800618833.
- Inglis-Jones, Elisabeth (1955). The Story of Wales. Faber & Faber. ISBN 978-7-250-01074-4.
