= Llangybi, Ceredigion =

Village and community in Ceredigion, Wales

Llangybi
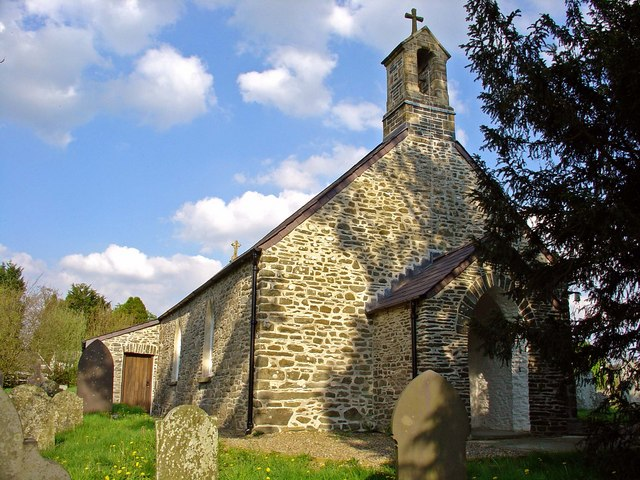

- Location within Ceredigion
- Population: 653 (2011)
- OS grid reference: SN578478
- Principal area: Ceredigion
- Preserved county: Dyfed
- Country: Wales
- Sovereign state: United Kingdom
- Post town: Lampeter
- Postcode district: SA48
- Dialling code: 01570
- Police: Dyfed-Powys
- Fire: Mid and West Wales
- Ambulance: Welsh
- UK Parliament: Ceredigion Preseli
- Senedd Cymru – Welsh Parliament: Ceredigion Penfro
- List of places UK Wales Ceredigion 52.1592°N 4.0359°W Community map: Map of the community

Llangybi is a village and community in the south of Ceredigion, Wales. It is located on the A485 between Tregaron to the north and Lampeter to the south, a mile and a half north of the village of Betws Bledrws, which is in the wider community. Silian is another village located within the community.

The River Dulas flows past the village and joins the River Teifi near Lampeter.

Llangybi is one of three villages in Wales named after Saint Cybi. The local church is also dedicated to Saint Cybi, which currently lies within the deanery of Lampeter of the diocese of Saint David's, and was at one time in the alternate patronage of the Earl of Lisburne and Lord Carrington.

Llangybi railway station was located on the Carmarthen to Aberystwyth line, closing in February 1965.

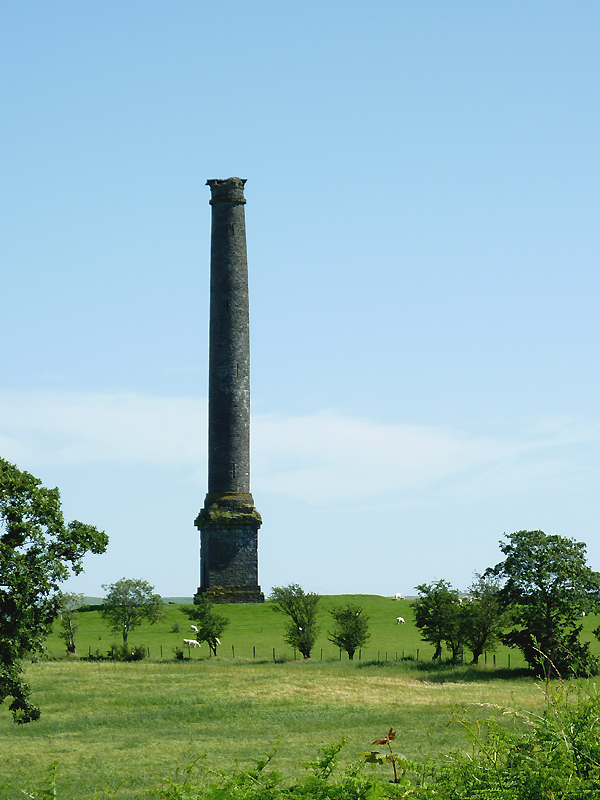
Derry Ormond Tower

The Derry Ormond Tower is situated very prominently on a spur of hill between the two minor valleys of the Afon Denys and Nant Dyfel and overlooking the Dulas valley. It is said to have been built by local unemployed for the squire of Derry Ormond House. It is a grade II* structure but currently in poor condition with missing stairs.

== Governance ==
An electoral ward of the same name also exists. This stretches beyond the boundaries of the Community with a total population of 1,484.

== Notable residents ==
- David Davis 1745–1827), Welsh minister and poet, bardic name Dafis Castellhywel, was born at Goetre farmhouse
- Elisabeth Inglis-Jones (1900–1994), a Welsh historical novelist, local historian and biographer; raised in the village of Derry Ormond
- Kathryn Jenkins (1961–2009), a scholar of Welsh language and culture, lived and died in Llangybi
