= Harford Fountain =

Fountain in Lampeter, Ceredigion, Wales

Coordinates: 52°06′46″N 4°04′42″W

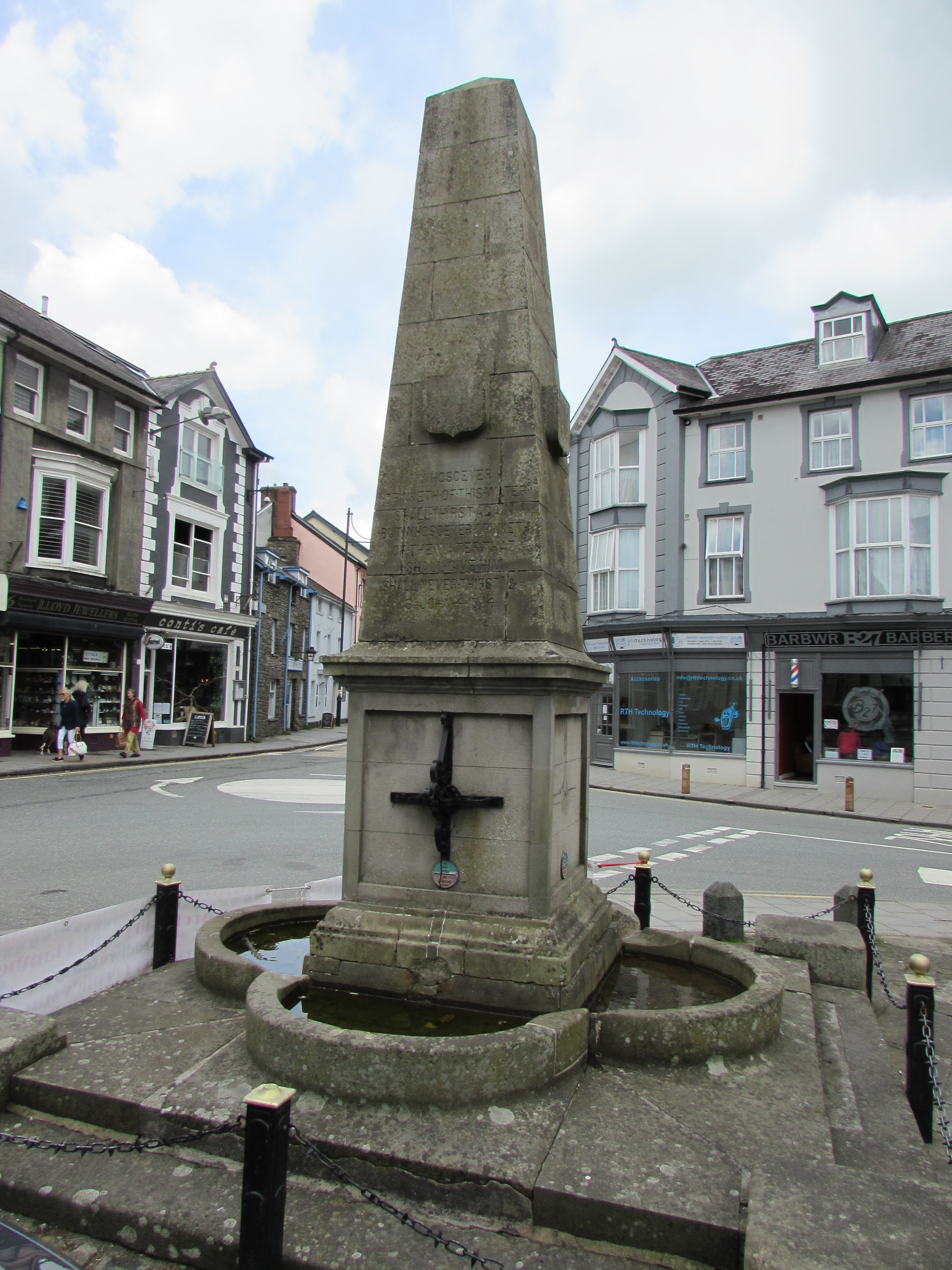
Harford Fountain in 2019

Harford Fountain, is a 19th-century grade II listed fountain in Harford Square, in Lampeter, Ceredigion.

== History ==
The Fountain was built in 1862, restored in 1990 and listed in 1992. It is made of grey Forest of Dean stone. It is an obelisk on a panelled pedestal base. There are iron Spigots one each side, which are mounted on wrought-iron cruciform supports, that have brass fox-mask mouths. There are shields each side, one with carved Harford Arms. The inscription records that the fountain was a gift from J S Harford of Peterwell. The Harford family lived at the Falcondale Estate, on the outskirts of Lampeter. The fountain provided the first drinking water for the people in the town
