= Carl Almquist =

Swedish stained-glass artist (1848–1924)

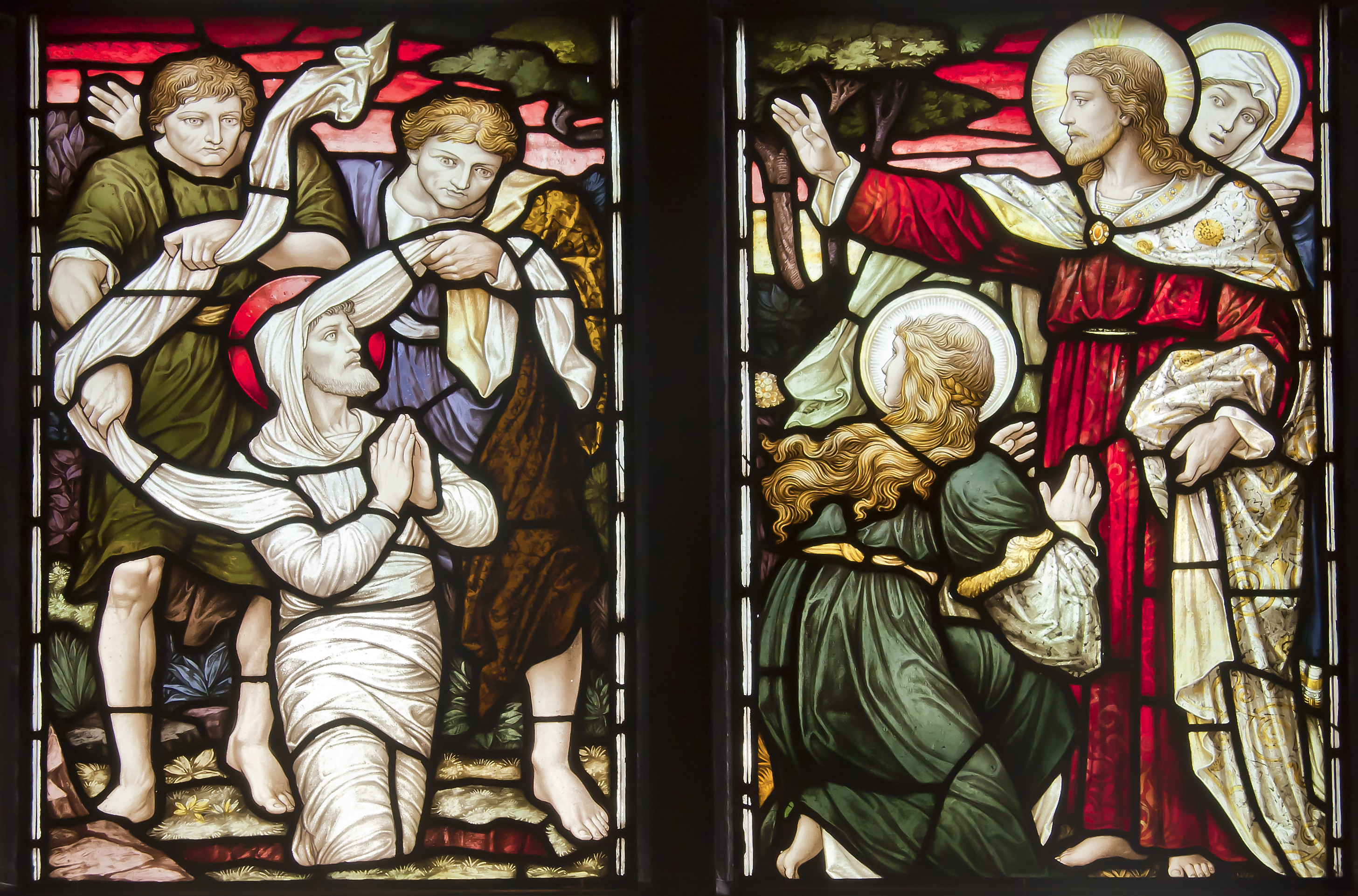
The Raising of Lazarus window in St. Nicholas Church, Örebro

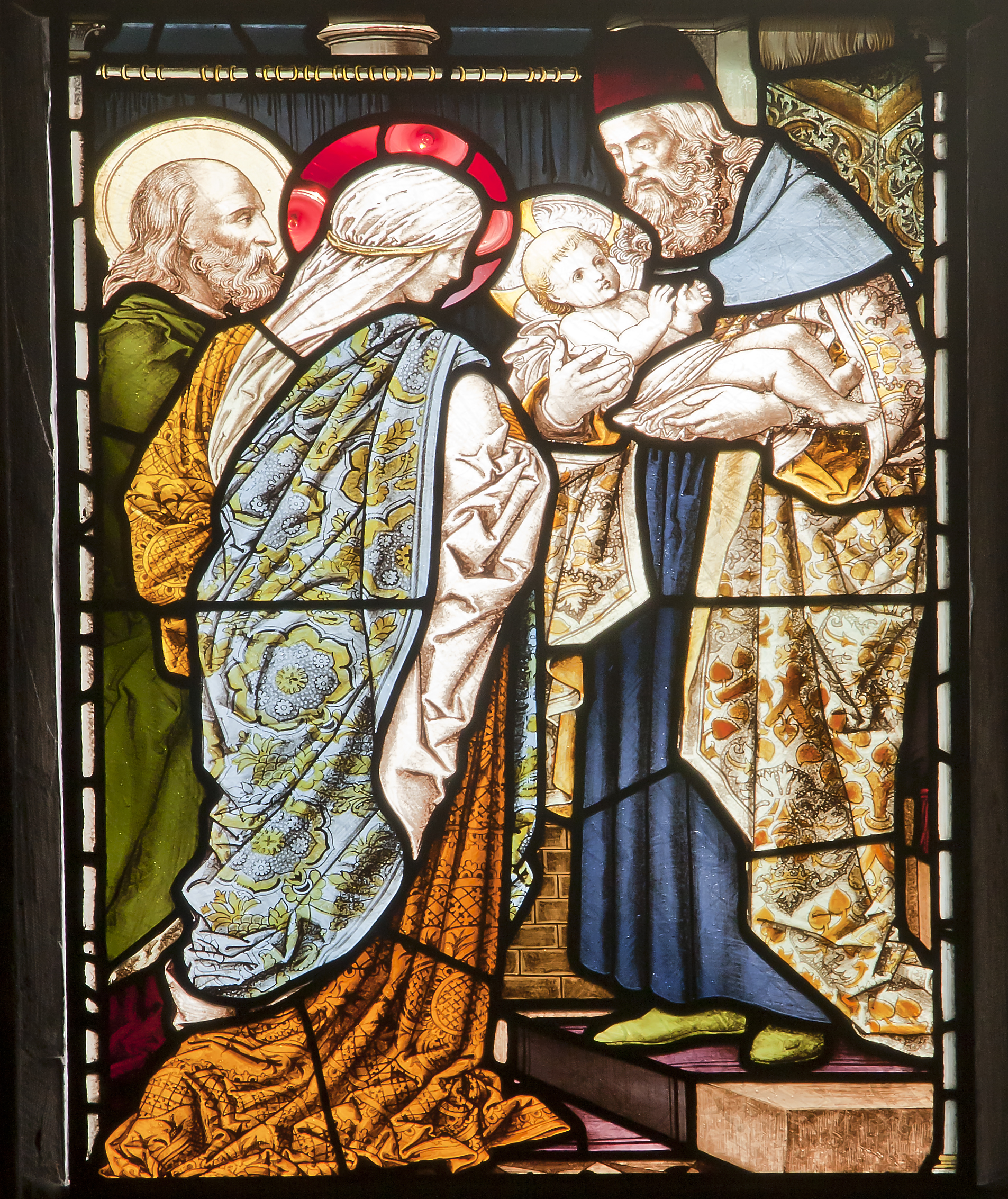
The Presentation of Jesus window in St. Nicholas Church, Örebro

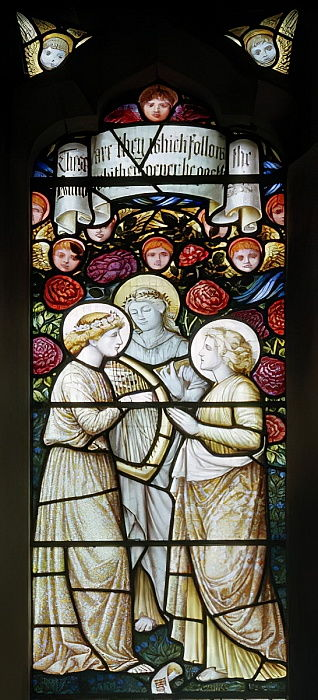
Window in St Tysilio's Church, Llantysilio, Clwyd

Carl Almquist (1848 – 1924) was a Swedish-born stained-glass artist whose professional life was spent entirely in Britain. He was a pupil of Henry Holiday and became one of the two chief designers for the well-known Lancaster firm of Shrigley and Hunt. He was in large measure responsible for establishing their late Pre-Raphaelite or Aesthetic style. Though largely neglected by 20th-century art historians he has more recently been acclaimed as a genius, and as one of the leading late-Victorian stained-glass designers.

== Career ==
Carl Almquist was born in 1848 in Almby, near Örebro, Sweden. Wanting to study stained-glass production and not being able to do so in Sweden, he travelled to England at the age of 22 under the sponsorship of Adolf Kjellström, a local architecture teacher. He became a pupil, and soon an employee, of the Pre-Raphaelite artist Henry Holiday, one of the leading stained-glass designers of the day, while also finding work with various other studios, including Burlison and Grylls, Heaton, Butler and Bayne, and James Powell and Sons.

In December 1873 he began to get work from the new Lancaster firm of Shrigley and Hunt, both as a stained-glass designer and a decorative artist in other media, and in 1876 he became a permanent employee and moved to Lancaster. Here the firm's founder, Arthur William Hunt, and his two chief designers, Almquist and Edward Holmes Jewitt, worked as a close team, drawing particularly on the Aesthetic techniques Almquist had derived from Holiday and from Harry Ellis Wooldridge of the James Powell studio; they developed a house style of subtle colours (becoming richer in later years) and delicate drawing which defined Shrigley and Hunt until well into the 20th century. Almquist soon found he much preferred life in London, so to keep the company together Hunt opened a London branch for him in 1878. Almquist was still not finished with education, and from 1878 to 1884 attended the West London School of Art. This culminated with his being awarded a travelling scholarship to spend two months in Italy studying decorative art. As the years passed his style developed, with the Pre-Raphaelite influence becoming less obvious and those of Botticelli, Dürer and contemporary Scottish glass designers more so. Almquist designed many windows for locations in Scotland, Wales, the Home Counties, Yorkshire, and above all in the north-west of England, and there are scattered examples elsewhere. Though he never returned to Sweden he designed several of the stained glass windows for the St. Nicholas Church, Örebro, then being restored by his old friend Adolf Kjellström, and later for the Olaus Petri Church in the same town. Stylistic evidence also suggests that while employed by Shrigley and Hunt Almquist did some freelance work for the firm of Burlison and Grylls.

In 1920, suffering from failing eyesight, he retired to the seaside resort of Hove, Sussex. He continued to send designs to Shrigley and Hunt and was paid for them, but they were never used. He died at Hove in 1924.
