= Maestir =

Village in Ceredigion, Wales

Coordinates: 52.124322°N 4.114097°W

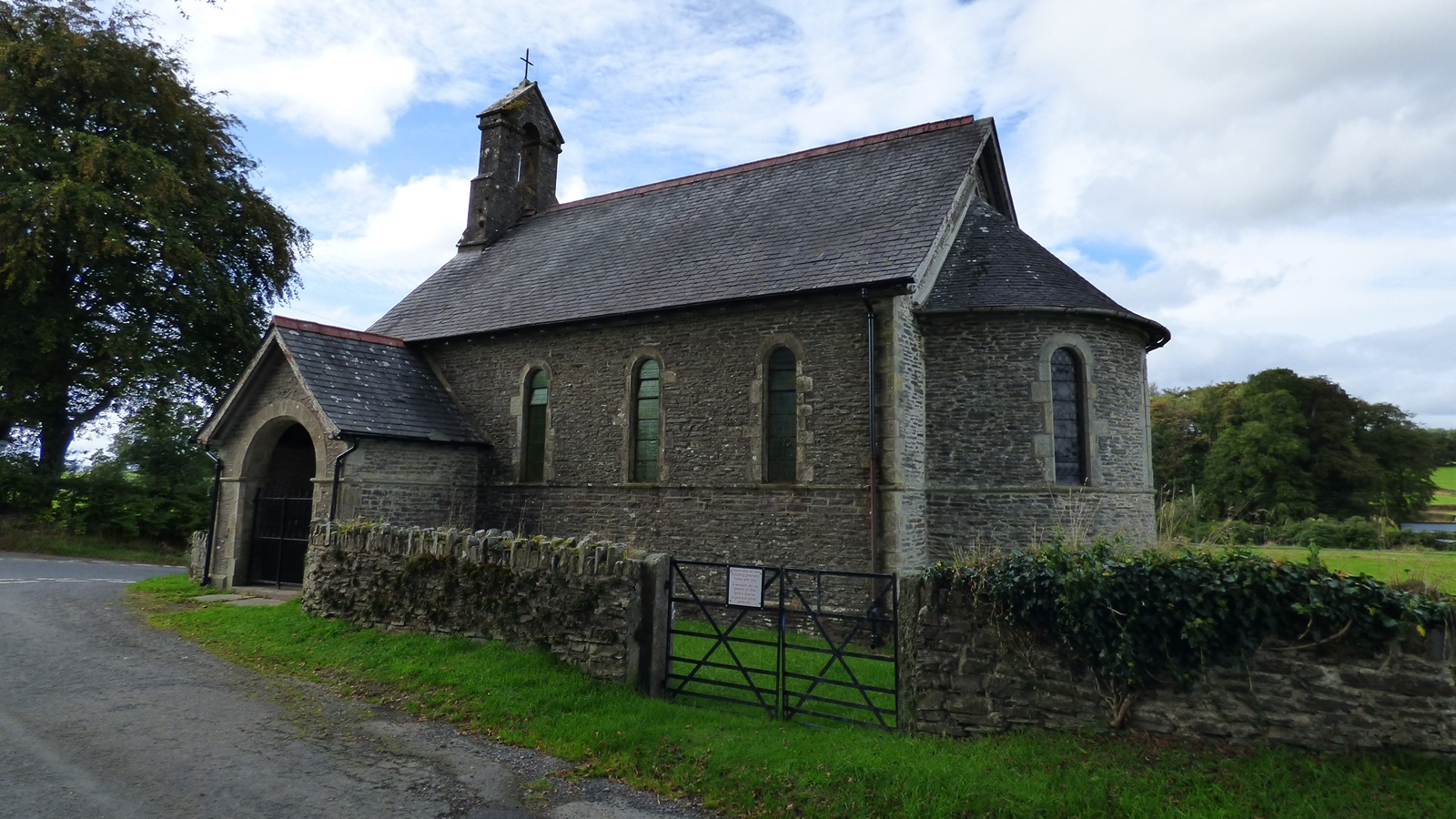
- St Mary's Church

- Location within Ceredigion
- OS grid reference: SN 5537 4944
  - Cardiff: 59.9 mi (96.4 km)
  - London: 175.5 mi (282.4 km)
- Community: Llanwnnen
- Principal area: Ceredigion
- Country: Wales
- Sovereign state: United Kingdom
- Post town: Lampeter
- Postcode district: SA48
- Police: Dyfed-Powys
- Fire: Mid and West Wales
- Ambulance: Welsh
- UK Parliament: Ceredigion Preseli
- Senedd Cymru – Welsh Parliament: Ceredigion

Maestir is a hamlet near Lampeter, in the community of Llanwnnen, Ceredigion, Wales.

There is a church there, dedicated to St Mary. It was historically in the parish of Lampeter and now forms its own Church in Wales parish.

Maestir School was built in 1880 by Charles Harford for the children of the farmworkers at Falcondale estate. It served less than 40 children aged between 5 and 14 until it closed in 1916 due to a lack of children attending. In 1984, it was brought to St Fagans National Museum of History, where it remains today. The building is made of shale from local quarries, and the roof is made of slate mined in North Wales.

== See also ==
- List of localities in Wales by population
