= Olaus Petri Church =

Coordinates: 59.2803°N 15.2189°E

- Olaus Petri kyrka
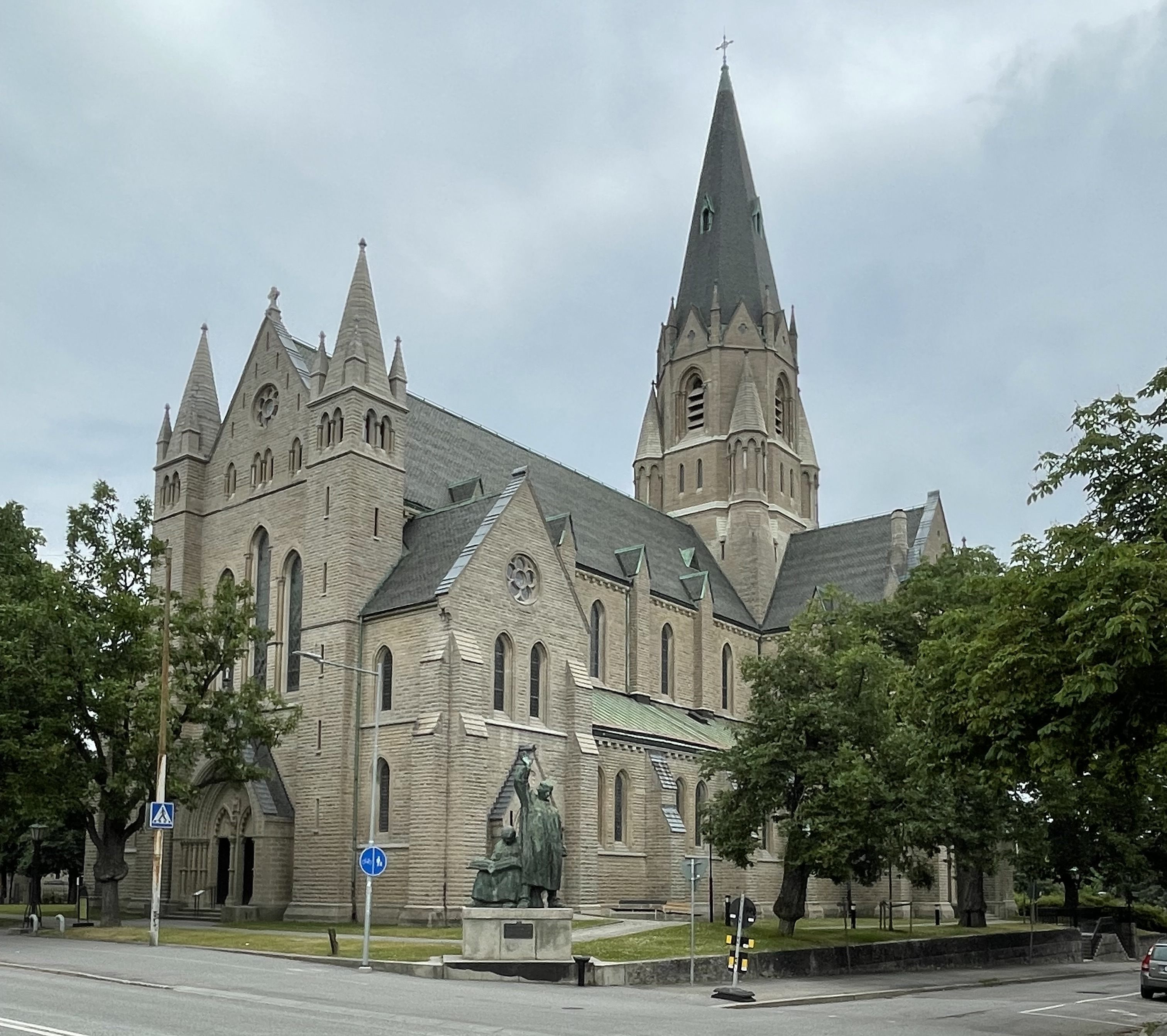
- Olaus Petri Church in June 2022
- Olaus Petri Church
- Location: Örebro
- Country: Sweden
- Denomination: Church of Sweden

Administration
- Diocese: Strängnäs
- Parish: Örebro Olaus Petri

Olaus Petri Church (Swedish: Olaus Petri kyrka) is a church building in Örebro in Sweden. Belonging to the Örebro Olaus Petri Parish of the Church of Sweden, it was opened on Fourth Advent Sunday 1912.
