= St. Nicholas Church, Örebro =

Coordinates: 59.2722°N 15.2114°E

Saint Nicholas Church
- Nicholas Church
- Sankt Nikolai kyrka
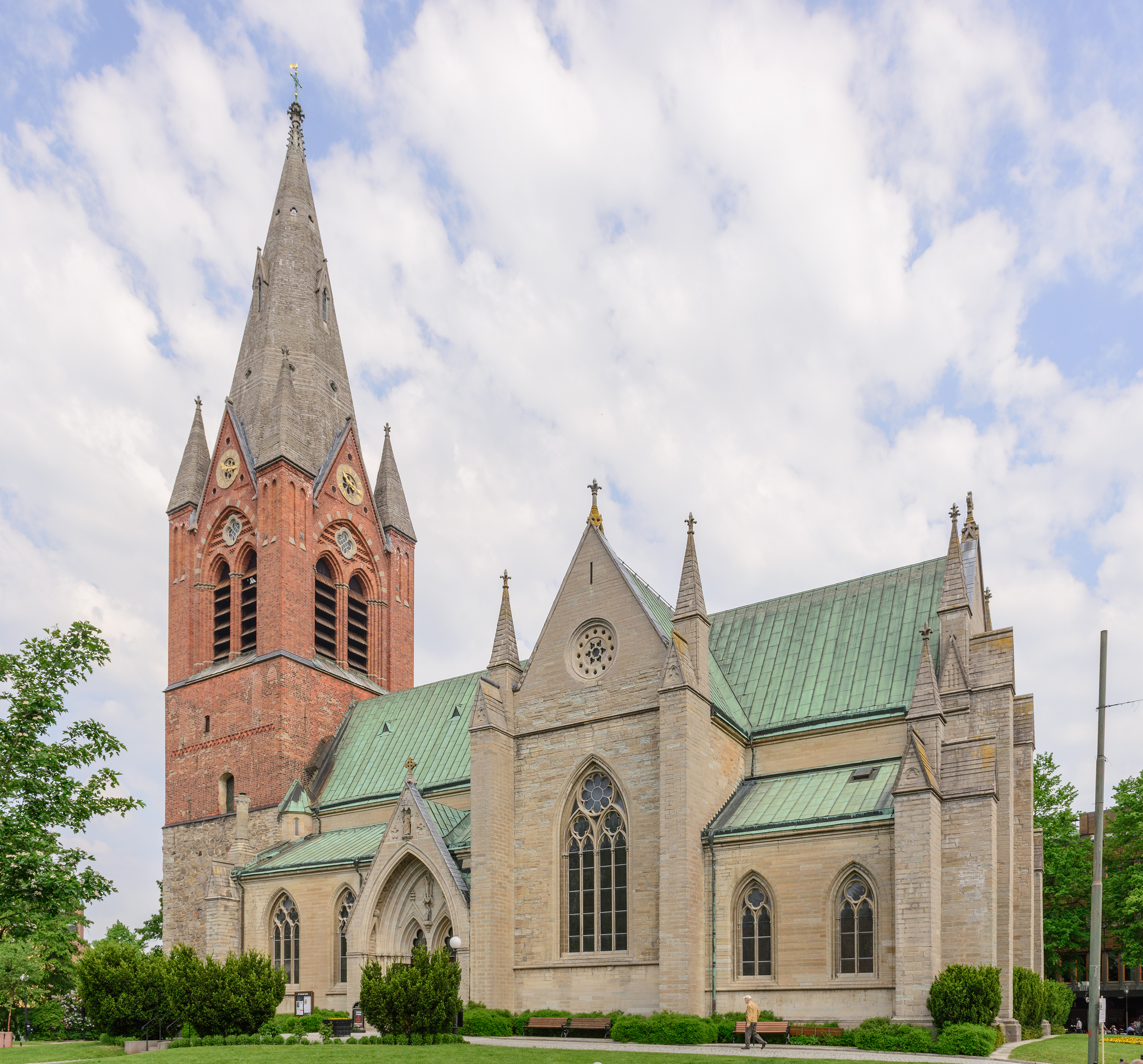
- Saint Nicholas Church in May 2014
- Saint Nicholas Church
- Location: Örebro
- Country: Sweden
- Denomination: Church of Sweden

History
- Former name: Örebro Church
- Dedication: Saint Nicholas
- Consecrated: 14th ventury

Administration
- Diocese: Diocese of Strängnäs
- Parish: Örebro Nikolai

The Saint Nicholas Church (Swedish: Sankt Nikolai kyrka) or the Nicholas Church (Swedish: Nikolaikyrkan) is a church building in central Örebro, Sweden. It was originally called the Örebro Church (Swedish: Örebro kyrka) because it was the only Church of Sweden building in town until the early 20th century. Örebro Nikolai parish is in the Diocese of Strängnäs of the Church of Sweden.

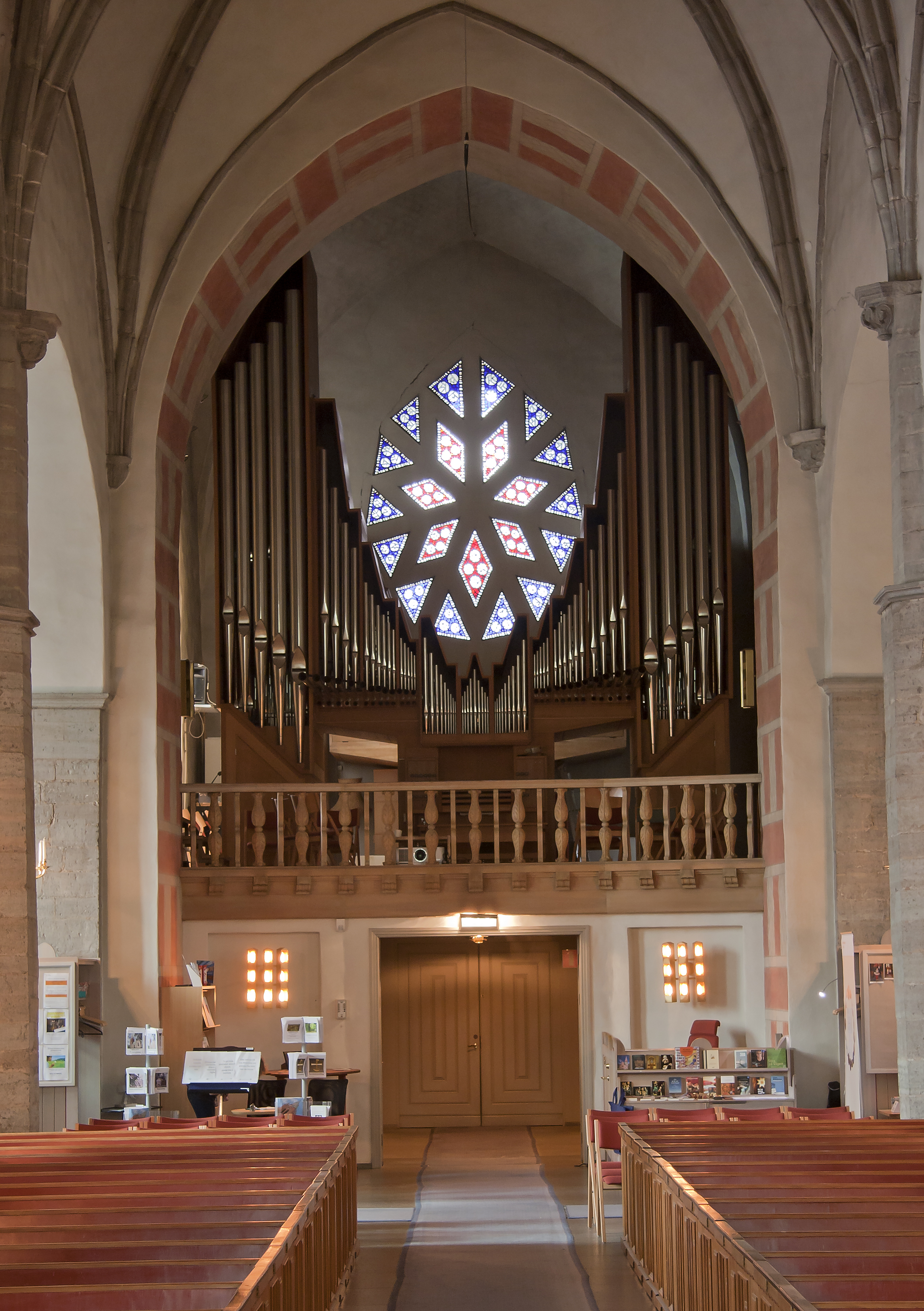
Saint Nicholas Church interior

== History ==
Construction began in the late 13th century and is supposed to have been completed by the mid-14th century. Large parts of the church are built with limestone. There are Romanesque styles in the oldest parts and therefore Gothic Style in the newer. The oldest is the choir area from around 1275–1300.

The current look of the church dates from the great restoration between 1863 and 1900, when the church's Gothic style was emphasized. The restoration proposal had been made by Carl Georg Brunius (1793–1869) and was completed by Axel Herman Hägg (1835–1921) and associate professor Adolf Kjellström (1834–1932). Partial renovations took place in 1936 under the direction of architect Erik Fant (1889–1954) and in 1962–64 after drawings by architect Kurt von Schmalensee (1896–1972). The latest renovation took place in 1979–80.
