= Betws Bledrws =

Village in Ceredigion, Wales

Coordinates: 52.149°N 4.054°W

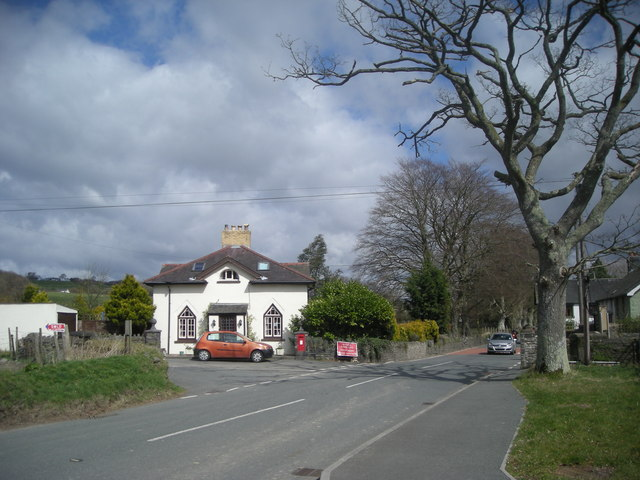
Betws Bledrws

Betws Bledrws, is a village between Lampeter and Llangybi, Ceredigion, Wales that was also known as Derry Ormond when under the influence of Derry Ormond Mansion. Situated on the valley floor of the River Dulas, approximately 3 miles (4.8 km) north of Lampeter and a mile or so to the southwest of the village of Llangybi, on the road from Tregaron to Lampeter.

Betws Bledrws (SN596520) lies beside the Afon Dulas, 4.8 km north-west of Lampeter on the B4343. Its name combines betws—from Middle English bed-hus ("prayer house")—with Bledrws.

== History ==
During the nineteenth century the parish extended to about 1,600 acres and supported 227 inhabitants. Samuel Lewis judged Derry Ormond "one of the best houses in the county", observing that its ornamental lake and plantations dominated the scene. He described a mainly pastoral economy: arable ground was limited, lead ore was thought to lie beneath the surface but never exploited, and annual poor-law expenditure stood at £89 17 s.

Nonconformity thrived beside the parish church. Pen-y-coed Baptist chapel was erected in 1735, re-roofed in slate in 1827 and, after services moved to Silian in 1831, allowed to decay; the ruin was finally cleared before 1998. Lewis also recorded separate meeting houses for Calvinistic Methodists.

Between Derry Ormond and the River Teifi an oval Iron-Age earthwork known as Castell Goedtrêv crowns a low knoll, lending its name to the adjoining farm and adding an earlier layer of human occupation to the locality. Derry Ormond Mansion, a neo-classical seat by Charles Robert Cockerell for John Jones (c. 1825–1953), shaped the parish; its landscaped park is registered Grade II. Jones also erected Tŵr y Dderi, a 31 m-ashlar column (1821–24) now Grade II.

St Bledrws Church was rebuilt in 1831—probably by Cockerell—and altered in 1886; it retains a 12th-century square font, and the churchyard holds the grave of David Morgan, contractor of the tower. Modern Betws Bledrws is a line of farms and houses along the valley road, with the column still a dominant landmark.

- Postcode SA48 8
- Gridref SN596520
