= Derry Ormond =

Farm and village in Ceredigion, Wales

Coordinates: 52.155127°N 4.061612°W

- Location within Ceredigion
- OS grid reference: SN 5906 5276
  - Cardiff: 60.1 mi (96.7 km)
  - London: 173.8 mi (279.7 km)
- Community: Llangybi
- Principal area: Ceredigion
- Country: Wales
- Sovereign state: United Kingdom
- Post town: Aberaeron
- Postcode district: SA48
- Police: Dyfed-Powys
- Fire: Mid and West Wales
- Ambulance: Welsh
- UK Parliament: Ceredigion Preseli
- Senedd Cymru – Welsh Parliament: Ceredigion

Derry Ormond is a farm and a small village in the community of Llangybi, Ceredigion, Wales, which is 60.1 miles (96.7 km) from Cardiff and 173.8 miles (279.7 km) from London. Derry Ormond is represented in the Senedd by Elin Jones (Plaid Cymru) and the Member of Parliament is Ben Lake (Plaid Cymru).

== See also ==
- List of localities in Wales by population
