= Ciliau-Aeron Halt railway station =

Former railway station in Wales

Ciliau-Aeron Halt

General information
- Location: Ceredigion; Wales
- Coordinates: 52.2100°N 4.1931°W
- Grid reference: SN5020459163
- Platforms: 1

Other information
- Status: Disused

History
- Original company: Lampeter, Aberayron and New Quay Light Railway
- Pre-grouping: Lampeter, Aberayron and New Quay Light Railway
- Post-grouping: Great Western Railway

Key dates
- 12 May 1911: Station opened
- 12 February 1951: Station closed (last train)
- 7 May 1951: Station closed (official)
- 1963: Closed for goods traffic
Location

Ciliau-Aeron Halt was a small railway station on the Aberayron branch of the Carmarthen to Aberystwyth Line in the Welsh county of Ceredigion serving the hamlet of Ciliau Aeron and the nearby estate of Tyglyn. Opened by the Lampeter, Aberayron and New Quay Light Railway, the branch to Aberayron diverged from the through line at Lampeter.

== History ==
The branch was incorporated into the Great Western Railway during the Grouping of 1923, passing on to the Western Region of British Railways on nationalisation in 1948. Passenger services were discontinued in 1951, general freight in 1963, and milk traffic from near Felin Fach ceased in 1973.

Photographs from 1957 show that the brick and stone-built platform had a crossing keeper's hut, lighting, a corrugated iron shelter and an old railway wagon as a store. A passing loop lay just short of the platform in the direction of Felin Fach.

== Notes ==
Preceding station	Disused railways	Following station
Felin Fach	Great Western Railway; Lampeter, Aberayron and New Quay Light Railway	Crossways
