= Registered historic parks and gardens in Ceredigion =

List of buildings in county of Wales

Ceredigion shown within Wales

Ceredigion is a county in the west of Wales. It covers an area of 1,785 km^{2} (689 sq mi) and in 2021 the population was approximately 70,700.

The Cadw/ICOMOS Register of Parks and Gardens of Special Historic Interest in Wales was established in 2002 and given statutory status in 2022. It is administered by Cadw, the historic environment agency of the Welsh Government. Elisabeth Whittle described Cadw as having a "somewhat special and guiding role" in the preservation of historic parks and gardens, since they are "an integral part of Welsh archaeological and architectural heritage". The register includes just under 400 sites, ranging from gardens of private houses, to cemeteries and public parks. Parks and gardens are listed at one of three grades, matching the grading system used for listed buildings. Grade I is the highest grade, for sites of exceptional interest; Grade II*, the next highest, denotes parks and gardens of great quality; while Grade II denotes sites of special interest.

There are 12 registered parks and gardens in Ceredigion. One is listed at Grade I, two at Grade II*, and nine at Grade II.

== Key ==
Grade	Criteria
I	Parks and gardens of exceptional interest
II*	Parks and gardens of great quality
II	Parks and gardens of special interest

== List of parks and gardens ==
List of parks and gardens
Name	Location Grid Ref. (Note: Sometimes known as OSGB36, the grid reference is based on the British national grid reference system used by the Ordnance Survey.) Geo-coordinates	Date Listed	Description / Notes	Grade	Reference Number	Image
Alltyrodyn	Llandysul; SN4485744318; 52°04′30″N 4°15′51″W	1 February 2022	Gardens The pleasure grounds and walled gardens are contemporary with the house built in the 1830s.	II	PGW(Dy)46(CER)	small lodge on road at entrance to Alltyrodyn
Cardigan Castle	Cardigan; SN1772845981; 52°04′54″N 4°39′37″W	1 February 2022	Garden The late-Georgian garden is set within the ward of the medieval castle.	II	PGW(Dy)72(CER)	Cardigan Castle
Coedmore	Llangoedmor; SN1938843696; 52°03′42″N 4°38′06″W	1 February 2022	Gardens The present house (built 1816–1833) is to the south of woodlands within which is an earlier enclosed garden.	II	PGW(Dy)70(CER)	a large house surrounded by trees
Derry Ormond	Llangybi; SN5890052330; 52°09′03″N 4°03′45″W	1 February 2022	Park and gardens The tower (built 1821–1824) is on a hilltop to the south of, and separated from, the parkland and gardens around the site of the house (built 1824–1826, but demolished in 1933).	II	PGW(Dy)48(CER)	a monumental stone column
Hafod	Ysbyty Ystwyth; SN7629273202; 52°20′33″N 3°48′58″W	1 February 2022	Landscape Cadw describes the site as "one of the most important and influential Picturesque landscapes of the late eighteenth century in Britain".	I	PGW(Dy)50(CER)	a stone bridge over a stream
Llanerchaeron	Ciliau Aeron; SN4853159719; 52°12′52″N 4°13′02″W	1 February 2022	Park and gardens The house (built c. 1794), walled gardens and pleasure grounds are set within parkland and are to the north-west of Ciliau Park, a separate enclosure that became part of the estate in 1735.	II	PGW(Dy)51(CER)	a walled garden
Llanllyr	Llanfihangel Ystrad; SN5426955817; 52°10′51″N 4°07′54″W	1 February 2022	Park and gardens The kitchen garden was probably built at the same time as the house (c. 1830). In the 1980s and 1990s formal and informal gardens were laid out and planted within an early nineteenth-century framework.	II	PGW(Dy)28(CER)	small summer house in a garden
Lodge Park	Llangynfelyn; SN6626193563; 52°31′23″N 3°58′17″W	1 February 2022	Deer park and garden The seventeenth-century deer park occupies a roughly oval area. The walled kitchen garden to the north of the house probably dates from late eighteenth century.	II	PGW(Dy)61(CER)	
Nanteos	Trawsgoed; SN6197578436; 52°23′10″N 4°01′42″W	1 February 2022	Park and garden The mid-eighteenth-century house, walled garden and pleasure grounds are set within a medium-sized landscape park.	II*	PGW(Dy)52(CER)	open grassland in front of country house, with trees in the background
Pigeonsford Walled Garden	Llangrannog; SN3245854248; 52°09′38″N 4°26′59″W	1 February 2022	Walled garden The former kitchen garden is possibly contemporary to the re-building of Pigeonsford Mansion in the 1750s. The five-sided brick gazebo was built in the 1930s.	II	PGW(Dy)41(CER)	Pigeonsford Walled Garden
Trawsgoed	Trawsgoed; SN6752673507; 52°20′36″N 3°56′42″W	1 February 2022	Park and gardens The Trawsgoed estate has undergone numerous phases of construction. The layout of the park dates from the eighteenth century and the garden dates mainly to the late nineteenth century.	II	PGW(Dy)53(CER)	a country house viewed across open parkland
University of Wales, Aberystwyth: Plas Penglais, Penglais Campus and Llanbadarn Campus; The National Library of Wales	Llanbadarn Fawr; SN5974881713; 52°24′54″N 4°03′45″W	1 February 2022	Gardens The informal gardens and landscaped university campuses and library grounds were laid out in the twentieth century. A section of the Penglais campus is one of the very few surviving schemes to have been designed by Brenda Colvin.	II*	PGW(Dy)47(CER)	University of Wales, Aberystwyth: Plas Penglais, Penglais Campus and Llanbadarn Campus; The National Library of Wales

== See also ==
- Scheduled monuments in Ceredigion
- Grade I listed buildings in Ceredigion
- Grade II* listed buildings in Ceredigion
