= Crossways Halt railway station =

Former railway station in Wales

Crossways Halt

General information
- Location: Ceredigion; Wales
- Coordinates: 52.2149°N 4.2138°W
- Grid reference: SN4885159728
- Platforms: 1

Other information
- Status: Disused

History
- Original company: Great Western Railway
- Post-grouping: Great Western Railway

Key dates
- 8 April 1929: Station opened
- 12 February 1951: Station closed (last train)
- 7 May 1951: Station closed (official)
- 1963: Closed for goods traffic
Location

Crossways Halt was a small railway station on the Aberayron branch of the Carmarthen to Aberystwyth Line in the Welsh county of Ceredigion serving the rural area and the nearby estate of Llanerchaeron. Opened by the Lampeter, Aberayron and New Quay Light Railway, the branch to Aberayron diverged from the through line at Lampeter.

== History ==
This halt was opened by the Great Western Railway (GWR) in 1929. The branch was incorporated into the GWR during the Grouping of 1923, passing on to the Western Region of British Railways on nationalisation in 1948. Passenger services were discontinued in 1951, and general freight services ceased in 1963.

== Notes ==
Preceding station	Disused railways	Following station
Ciliau-Aeron	Great Western Railway; Lampeter, Aberayron and New Quay Light Railway	Llanerch-Ayron
