= Carmarthen Deanery =

Roman Catholic deanery in Wales

The Carmarthen Deanery is a Roman Catholic deanery in the Archdiocese of Cardiff-Menevia, previously in the Diocese of Menevia, that covers several churches in Carmarthenshire and the surrounding area. In the early 2010s, the Aberystwyth Deanery was dissolved and the church in Lampeter became part of the Carmarthen Deanery.

The deanery is centred at Blessed Sacrament Church in Gorseinon.

== Churches ==
- Our Lady of the Rosary, Ammanford
- Our Lady Star of the Sea, Burry Port
- Our Lady and St Cadoc, Kidwelly - served from Burry Port
- St Mary, Carmarthen
- Holy Cross, Pontyberem – served from Carmarthen
- Blessed Sacrament, Gorseinon
- St Bride's Convent, Pontarddulais - served from Gorseinon
- Our Lady of Mount Carmel, Lampeter
- St David, Llandeilo
- Our Lady, Llandovery
- Our Lady Queen of Peace Church, Llanelli - served by the Carmelites

== Gallery ==
Blessed Sacrament, Gorseinon

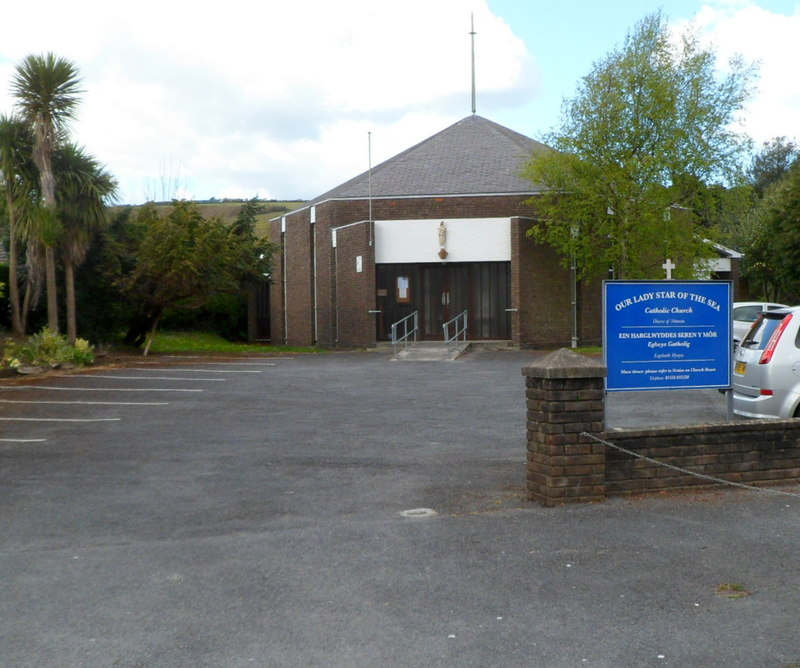
Our Lady Star of the Sea, Burry Port

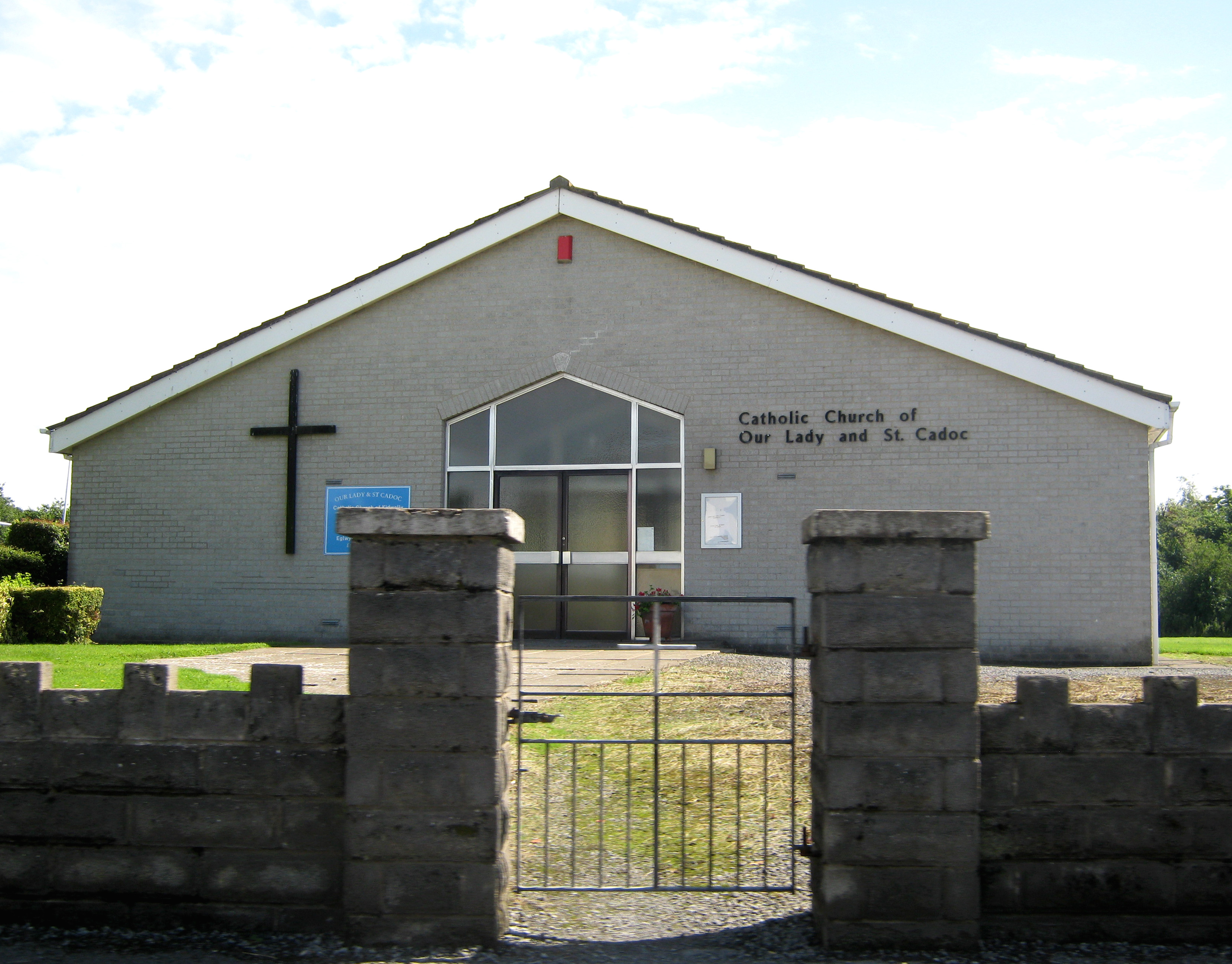
Our Lady and St Cadoc, Kidwelly

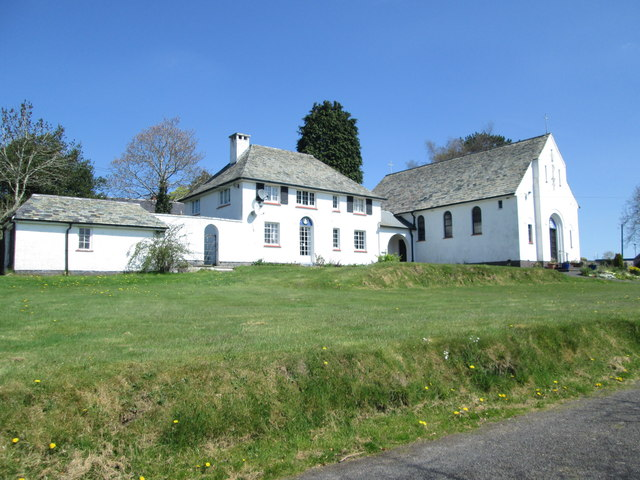
Our Lady of Mount Carmel, Lampeter

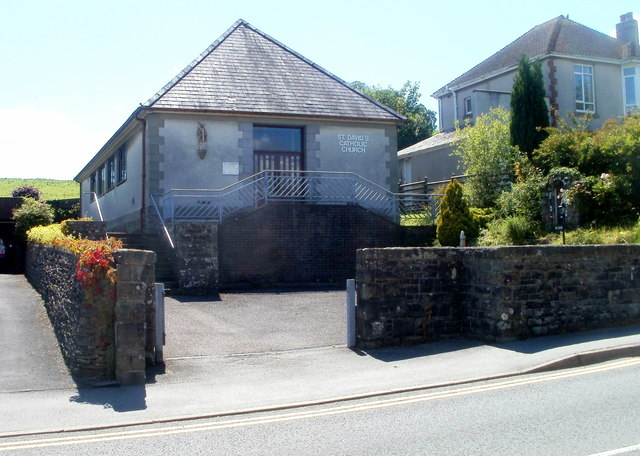
St David's, Llandeilo

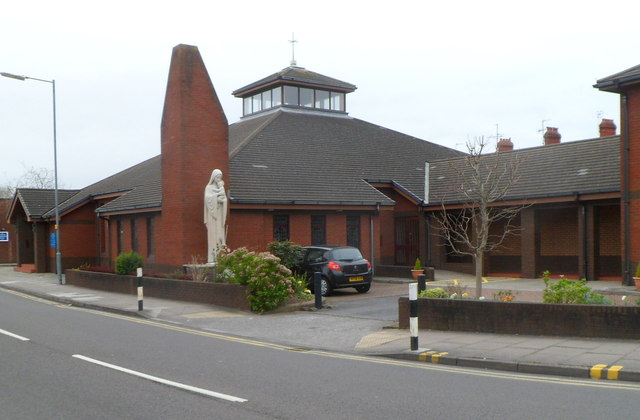
Our Lady Queen of Peace, Llanelli

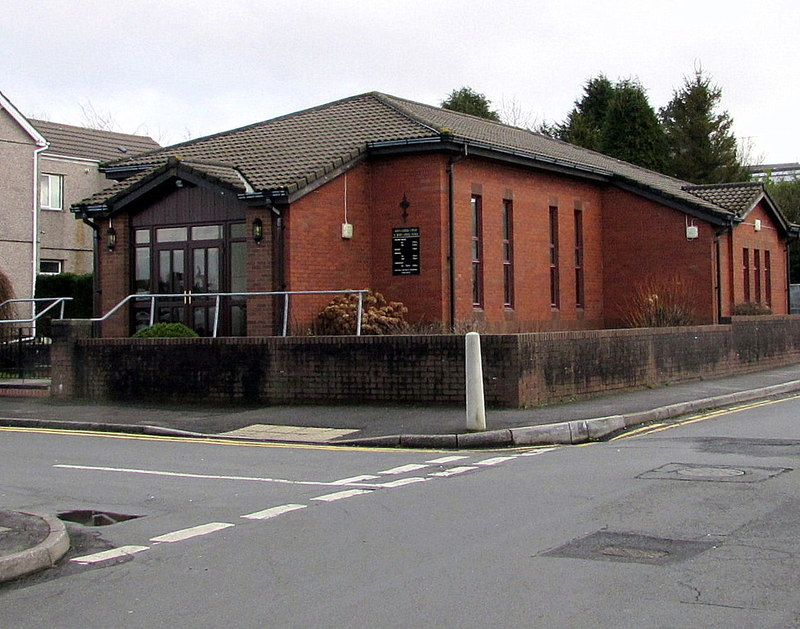
St Bride's, Pontarddulais
