= Evelyn Anna Lewes =

Evelyn Anna Lewes (c. 1873 – 1961) was a Welsh author and translator. She chronicled the outings of the Cambrian Archaeological Association in her best known work Out with the Cambrians (1934).

== Life and family ==
Lewes was one of three children of Major Price Lewes, an adjutant in the Pembroke militia and his wife Florence (n. Kinnear, of Halifax, Nova Scotia). She was born in 1873 in Canada and was raised in Poyston, Rudbaxton, Pembrokeshire. Around 1902, the family moved to Tyglyn Aeron, near Ciliau Aeron, Lampeter, Ceredigion. Her sister Mary Louisa Lewes was commandant of the Red Cross hospital in Aberaeron. In around 1928, Lewes moved to Eithinfa in Cliff Terrace, Aberystwyth.

She was a committee member of the Cambrian Archaeological Association, in 1916 she joined the Gorsedd and from 1940, she was also a member of the court of governors of U.C.W. and N.L.W.

On March 4, 1961, Lewes died at the Robert Jones and Agnes Hunt Orthopaedic Hospital. Her ashes were buried in Trefilan cemetery, Ceredigion.

== Work ==
In 1895, Lewes began publishing her poetry. She taught herself the Welsh language and published translations of poems by Dafydd ap Gwilym. At the Newcastle Emlyn Eisteddfod in 1902, she shared the best translation from Welsh to English prize for Gwilym's poem “Y Cywydd diweddaf i Forfudd."

Her work has been published in the Welsh newspapers Western Mail and Cambrian News, and magazines including: The Gentleman's Magazine (c. 1905), The Field and the Queen (c. 1905–14), The Bookman, Fishing Gazette, (1923–31), T. P.'s and Cassell's Weekly, (1927), Every woman's world (Toronto), and Western Home monthly (Winnipeg)

== Selected works ==
- Picturesque Aberayron (1899)
- Life and poems of Dafydd ap Gwilym (1914)
- Book Chapter: Some Welsh flower names (1914)
- A Guide to Aberayron and the Aeron Valley (1922)
- Dream folk and fancies (1926)
- Out with the Cambrians (1934)
