= Llanerch-Ayron Halt railway station =

Former railway station in Wales

Llanerch-Ayron Halt
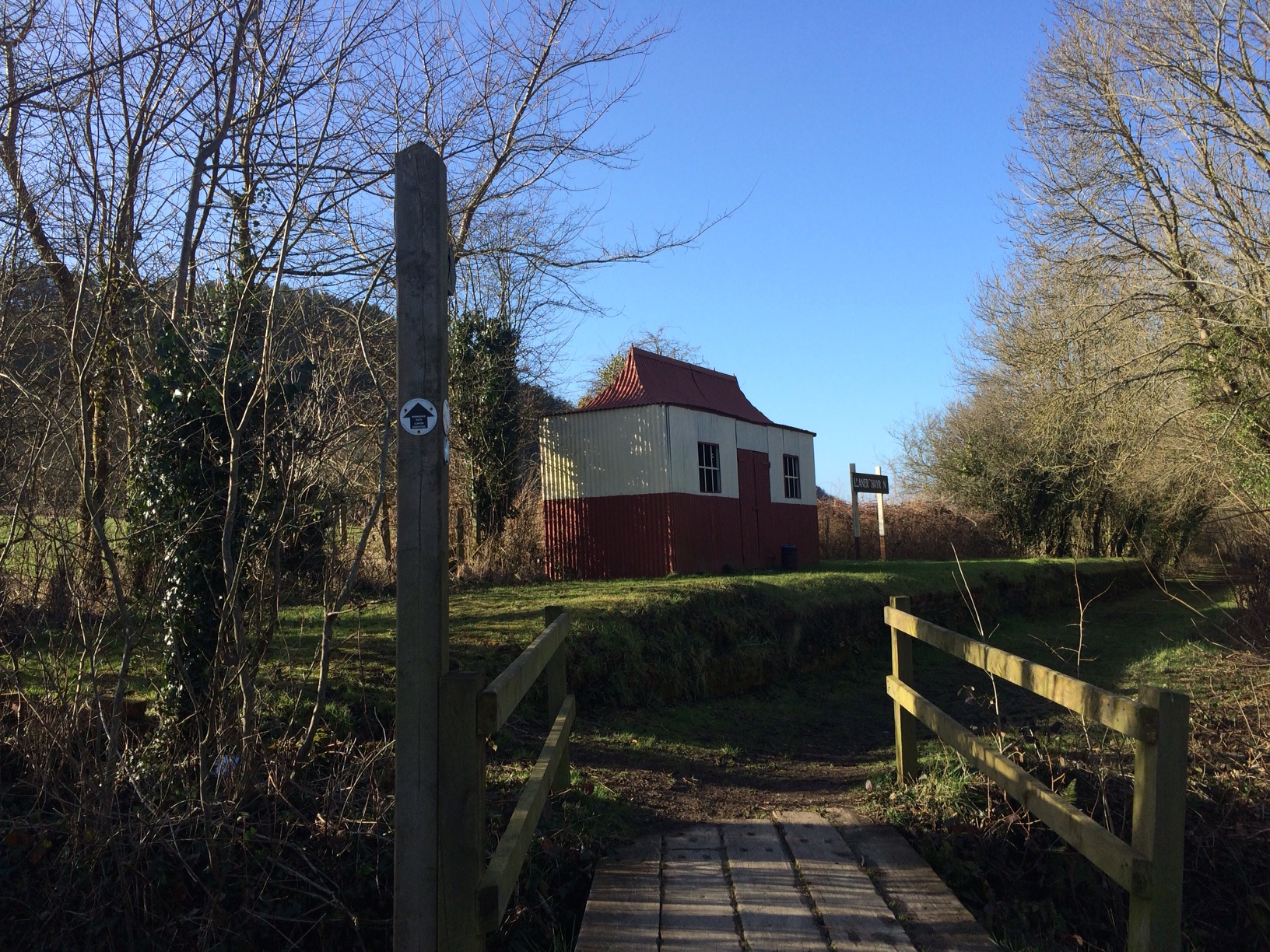
- Renovated station building near Llanerchaeron

General information
- Location: Ceredigion; Wales
- Coordinates: 52.2174°N 4.2328°W
- Grid reference: SN475600
- Platforms: 1

Other information
- Status: Disused

History
- Original company: Lampeter, Aberayron and New Quay Light Railway
- Pre-grouping: Lampeter, Aberayron and New Quay Light Railway
- Post-grouping: Great Western Railway

Key dates
- 2 October 1911: Station opened
- 12 February 1951: Station closed (last train)
- 7 May 1951: Station closed (official)
- 1963: Closed for goods traffic
Location

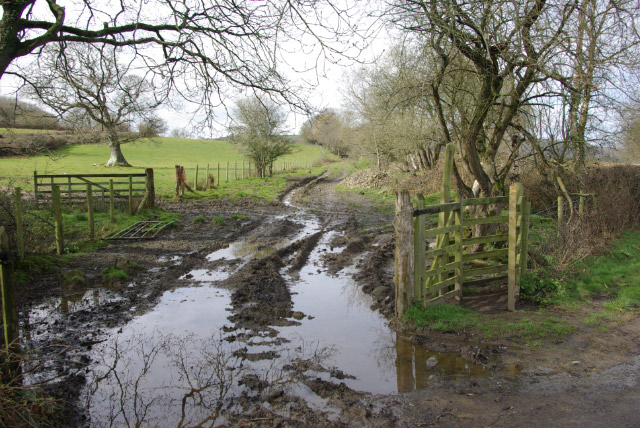
Section of the old railway near Llanerchaeron

Llanerch-Ayron Halt was a small railway station on the Aberayron branch of the Carmarthen to Aberystwyth Line in the Welsh county of Ceredigion serving the nearby estate of Llanerchaeron. Opened by the Lampeter, Aberayron and New Quay Light Railway, the branch to Aberayron diverged from the through line at Lampeter.

== History ==
The branch was incorporated into the Great Western Railway at the Grouping of 1923, passing on to the Western Region of British Railways on nationalisation in 1948. Passenger services were discontinued in 1951, general freight in 1963 and milk traffic from near Felin Fach ceased in 1973. The halt had a single platform and the line nearby was placed in cuttings to hide the line from the owners of the Llanerchaeron estate. The trackbed here is now a footpath, and the platform, nameboard and pagoda-roofed GWR shelter have been restored.

Preceding station	Disused railways	Following station
Crossways Halt; Line and station closed	Great Western Railway; Lampeter, Aberayron and New Quay Light Railway	Aberayron; Line and station closed
