= Our Lady Queen of Peace Church, Llanelli =

Our Lady Queen of Peace Church
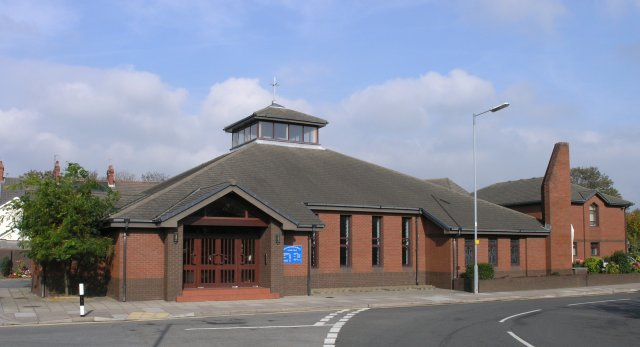
- Our Lady Queen of Peace Church
- 51.68089°N 4.16639°W
- Location: Llanelli
- Country: Wales
- Denomination: Roman Catholic
- Religious institute: Carmelites
- Website: OLQPLlanelli.org.uk

History
- Dedication: Our Lady of Peace
- Events: 2004, Carmelites

Architecture
- Architect: Gammon Partnership
- Style: Modern
- Groundbreaking: December 1993
- Completed: 11 July 1995

Administration
- Province: Cardiff-Menevia
- Archdiocese: Cardiff-Menevia
- Deanery: Carmarthen

Our Lady Queen of Peace Church is a Roman Catholic parish church in Llanelli, Carmarthenshire, Wales. It was built in 1995, replacing an older church built in 1938. It is located on Waunlanyrafon in Llanelli, opposite the police station. It is the only Catholic church in Wales served by a community of Carmelite priests.

== History ==
=== Church building ===
In the 1880s a Catholic mission started in Llanelli to serve the Catholic community in the town. In 1938, a church was built in the Gothic Revival style of architecture. In 1985, the church had structural issues and was demolished. In December 1993, construction started on a new church. On 11 July 1995, the church was opened by the Archbishop of Cardiff John Ward. In 2004, the Carmelites moved to Llanelli from Aberystwyth to serve the parish.

=== Carmelites ===
In 1936, the Carmelites returned to Wales, for the first time since the Reformation. They took over the running of St Mary's College in Aberystwyth, a seminary for the training of Catholic priests in the Welsh language, and Our Lady of the Angels Church in the town. From Aberystwyth they went out to found other churches and school. In the late 1930s they built Our Lady of Mount Carmel Church in Lampeter. After the Second World War, from Aberystwyth, the Carmelites founded a school in Tregib Manor in Llandeilo. Eventually, the Carmelite friars moved on from all those places and in 2002 decided to move from the parish in Aberystwyth to Llanelli, arriving in 2004.

== Parish ==
The church has two Sunday Masses at 6:00 pm on Saturday and at 10:00 am on Sunday.

== See also ==
- Media related to Our Lady Queen of Peace Church, Llanelli at Wikimedia Commons
- Archdiocese of Cardiff-Menevia

== Externals links ==
- Official website
