= Grade I listed buildings in Ceredigion =

Ceredigion shown within Wales

In the United Kingdom, the term listed building refers to a building or other structure officially designated as being of special architectural, historical, or cultural significance; Grade I structures are those considered to be "buildings of exceptional interest". Listing was begun by a provision in the Town and Country Planning Act 1947. Once listed, strict limitations are imposed on the modifications allowed to a building's structure or fittings. In Wales, the authority for listing under the Planning (Listed Buildings and Conservation Areas) Act 1990 rests with Cadw.

== Buildings ==
Name	Location Grid Ref. (Note: Sometimes known as OSGB36, the grid reference is based on the British national grid reference system used by the Ordnance Survey.) Geo-coordinates	Date Listed	Function	Notes	Reference Number	Image
St Gwenog Church, Llanwenog	Llanwenog; SN4938945526; 52°05′15″N 4°11′59″W	3 June 1964	Church	Situated on E side of minor lane connecting B4338 and A475 some 750m WSW of Drefach.	9817	See more images
St Padarn's Church, Llanbadarn Fawr	Llanbadarn Fawr; SN5990981012; 52°24′33″N 4°03′39″W	21 January 1964	Church	Situated on a sloping site just W of The Square in the centre of the village.	9832	See more images
Nanteos	Llanfarian; SN6201578629; 52°23′18″N 4°01′44″W	12 February 1952	Country House	Situated at the end of a long private drive which leads NE from the B4340.	9875	See more images
Church of St Michael, Penbryn	Penbryn; SN2935952115; 52°08′27″N 4°29′42″W	21 September 1964	Church	Situated in circular hillside churchyard to W of Hoffnant valley some 500m inland from Penbryn beach.	9899	See more images
Strata Florida Abbey ruins	Ystrad Fflur; SN7467665729; 52°16′31″N 3°50′18″W	5 December 1963	Abbey (ruin)	Situated about 1.5 km E of Pontrhydfendigaid on Abbey Road.	9913	See more images
Aberystwyth University Old College Building	Aberystwyth; SN5806981707; 52°24′54″N 4°05′18″W	21 July 1961	College	Dominating the southern end of the town's seafront; railed and grassed forecourt to seaward side.	10251	See more images
Aberystwyth Castle	Aberystwyth; SN5795681531; 52°24′48″N 4°05′24″W	14 September 1962	Castle	Situated on a promontory SW of the town centre.	10313	See more images
Cardigan Castle	Cardigan; SN1779245907; 52°04′53″N 4°39′38″W	16 June 1961	Castle	Situated on promontory overlooking Cardigan Bridge.	10458	See more images
Llanerchaeron	Ciliau Aeron; SN4792160197; 52°13′08″N 4°13′39″W	3 June 1964	Country House	On S side of road, reached off A482. 3 km SE of Aberaeron.	10715	See more images
Church of the Holy Cross, Mwnt	Y Ferwig; SN1950252015; 52°08′13″N 4°38′20″W	21 September 1964	Church	Situated above and some 125m NW of Mwnt beach under Foel y Mwnt.	15874	See more images

== See also ==
- Grade II* listed buildings in Ceredigion
- Listed buildings in Wales
- Scheduled monuments in Ceredigion
- Registered historic parks and gardens in Ceredigion
