= Theatr Felinfach =

Theatre in Ystrad Aeron, Ceredigion, Wales

Coordinates: 52.1912°N 4.1647°W

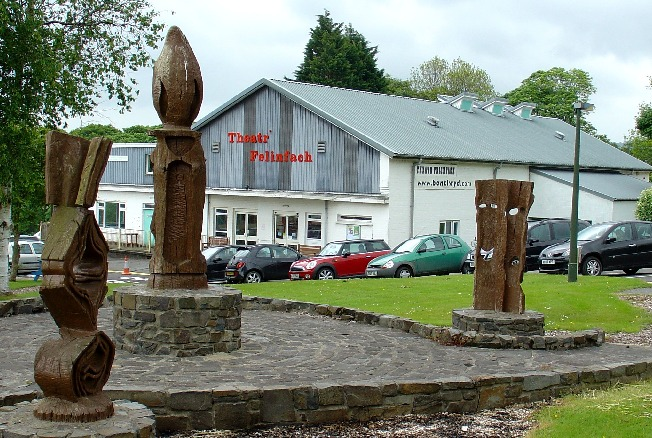
Theatr Felinfach

Theatr Felinfach is a small regional theatre located outside the village of Ystrad Aeron in Dyffryn Aeron, about 7 miles from the university town of Lampeter in Ceredigion, Wales.

Built in 1972, the theatre, which is supported by Ceredigion County Council and the Arts Council of Wales, has staged performances by drama, music and dance groups from across Britain but is perhaps best known for the many Welsh language plays and functions which it stages.

It is a major centre of Welsh culture and language in Mid Wales and is one of only a small number of theatres devoted primarily to productions in Welsh.
