= Lampeter Museum =

Local museum in Lampeter, Wales

- Old Porter's Lodge, College Street
- Established: 16 May 2014
- Location: Lampeter, Ceredigion, Wales
- Coordinates: 52.113274°N 4.077997°W
- Type: Local History
- Website: Official website

The Lampeter Museum (Welsh: Amgueddfa Llambedr Pont Steffan) was founded in 2014 by Hanes Llambed, the local history society, at the university campus.

The museum covers the cultural and agricultural development of Lampeter as well as the history of the college which was founded in 1822. The first exhibition hosted by the museum was about the town during the first world war.
