= Watcyn Samuel Jones =

Welsh agricultural administrator (1877–1964)

- Born: 16 February 1877; Lampeter
- Died: 17 October 1964 (aged 87)

Watcyn Samuel Jones (16 February 1877 – 17 October 1964) was a prominent Welsh agricultural administrator and principal of a theological college.

== Education ==
Jones was born in Lampeter to Rees Cribin Jones, a Unitarian church minister, and Mari Jones, his wife. He was the only survivor of four born children. He attended Lampeter school for a short time between 1890 and 1892. and Rev. David Evans' school at Cribyn between 1892 and 1894. He also briefly attended Llanybydder Grammar school, before he was enrolled into the Presbyterian College, Carmarthen toward the end of 1894. Whilst there he showed a keen interest in science and was the last student at the college to sit the science exam before studies were limited to matters of theology in 1895. He decided to withdraw from theological studies and instead decided to study a degree in art at Aberystwyth University (1895–1900). Due to his mother's illness, he postponed his studies before eventually obtaining a degree from Bangor University in 1902. He went on to study agriculture at Bangor, Aberystwyth and St John's College, Oxford and gained a reputation as an authority on the anatomy of trees. He published a standard textbook, Timbers, their structure and identification (1924). He contributed on the subject to Chambers’ Encyclopaedia in 1927.

== Career ==
In 1913 he returned to Wales to be near to his elderly father. Joining the civil service, he was appointed chief inspector of the Welsh office of the Board of Agriculture. For twenty-five years in this role, he developed agricultural education, and founded Wales' four agricultural institutions. He was presented with a M.A. degree in 1918 from his college in Oxford, and was given an M.Sc. the same year.

In 1937, aged 60, he resigned from the Ministry of Agriculture and accepted a job as the Principal of the Presbyterian College, Carmarthen. Despite his lack of religious zeal, Jones was well received at the college and made efforts to reform and expand the institution.

Watcyn and his wife retired to Llandre near Aberystwyth, and he died aged 87 on October 17, 1964.
