= Ciliau Aeron =

Village and community in Ceredigion, Wales

- Location within Ceredigion
- Population: 929 (2011)
- OS grid reference: SN500588
- Principal area: Ceredigion
- Preserved county: Dyfed
- Country: Wales
- Sovereign state: United Kingdom
- Post town: LAMPETER
- Postcode district: SA48
- Dialling code: 01570
- Police: Dyfed-Powys
- Fire: Mid and West Wales
- Ambulance: Welsh
- UK Parliament: Ceredigion Preseli
- Senedd Cymru – Welsh Parliament: Ceredigion Penfro
- List of places UK Wales Ceredigion 52.20719°N 4.19637°W Community map: Map of the community

Ciliau Aeron (Welsh for 'where the valley of the river Aeron narrows') is a community and small village 4 miles from Aberaeron in Ceredigion, Wales on the left bank of the River Aeron. The community includes the village of Cilcennin.

The word Ciliau comes from the Welsh for corners. Aeron Corners in English refers to the many bends taken by the river through this area.

The village post office has long gone, but Ciliau has a small, Welsh-speaking school and a village hall. There are fishing lakes in the village, as well as a garden nursery, an organic farm shop and a self-catering holiday centre for disabled children operated by the Ty Glyn Davis Trust.

The Ty Glyn Trust runs an eighteenth-century walled garden alongside the River Aeron; it is open to the public from dawn to dusk, every day of the week, without charge.

The Dylan Thomas Trail runs through Ciliau Aeron, passing the Tyglyn Aeron Hotel, which had been the home from the early 1900s of the poet and writer, Evelyn Anna Lewes (1873–1961). She is entered in the Dictionary of Welsh Biography. The publisher, Geoffrey Faber, bought the mansion in 1930 and T. S. Eliot took his holidays there throughout the 1930s.

The dockworker-poet James Hughes (Iago Trichrug) 1799-1844 was born in Ciliau Aeron at Neuadd-ddu.

The poet-priest David Davis (Dafis Castellhywel) 1745-1827 had his first ministry in the village's Unitarian chapel.

Just a mile away is the National Trust's Llanerchaeron estate.

Ciliau Aeron Halt was a station on the line from Lampeter to Aberaeron that closed in 1951.

== Governance ==
An electoral ward in the same name exists. This ward also includes some of the Aberaeron and Henfynyw areas. It had a total population at the United Kingdom Census 2011 of 1,974.
