= Church of Our Lady of Mount Carmel, Lampeter =

Coordinates: 52°06′51″N 4°04′58″W

Our Lady of Mount Carmel
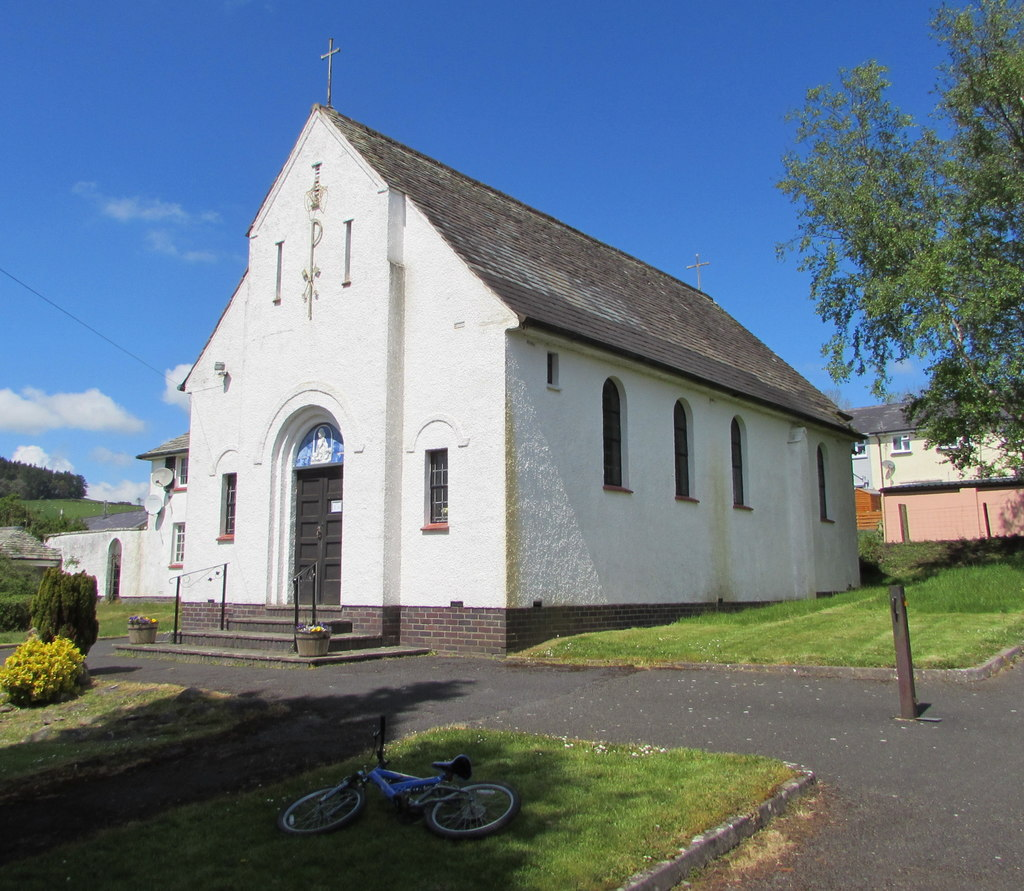
- Exterior of the church
- Our Lady of Mount Carmel
- Location: Pontfaen Road, Lampeter, Ceredigion
- Country: Wales
- Denomination: Catholic
- Website: http://catholicchurchlampeter.org/

History
- Founded: 1940
- Founder: Carmelite community of Aberystwyth

Architecture
- Functional status: Working
- Architect: T. H. B. Scott
- Style: Neo-Georgian
- Years built: 1939–1940

Administration
- Archdiocese: Cardiff-Menevia
- Parish: Our Lady of Mount Carmel

Clergy
- Priest: Fr Matthew Roche-Saunders

Listed Building – Grade II
- Official name: Church of Our Lady of Mount Carmel and Attached Presbytery (RC)
- Designated: 11 March 1992
- Reference no.: 1357354

The Church of Our Lady of Mount Carmel is a Roman Catholic church located in the university town of Lampeter in Ceredigion, Wales. Constructed by the London architect Thomas Henry Birchall Scott in the late 1930s for the Carmelite Order of the Roman Catholic Church, and opened in 1940, it is listed at Grade II and is considered one of the best examples of church architecture of the mid-20th century in west Wales. The church is dedicated to the Virgin Mary as patroness of the Carmelite Order, and was the first in Wales to be so dedicated.

== History ==
=== Background ===
Historically, since the Reformation, Anti-Catholic sentiments were common throughout Great Britain, and perhaps especially so in Wales due to the strong Nonconformist elements in Welsh Christianity. This was certainly the case in Lampeter which, since the establishment of St David's College in 1822, had been a centre for Anglicanism in Wales. Needless to say, the native Catholic population of the parish (and of the diocese as a whole) was small at the time. Nonetheless, in the late 1930s the Carmelite community of Aberystwyth, under the auspices of Fr. Malachy Lynch, founded the church at Lampeter, primarily for the growing number of Irish, Italian, and Polish immigrants who were coming to west Wales looking for work, whose nearest Catholic church had been 60 miles away.

=== Construction ===
Construction started in 1939, and finished in 1940. The church was designed by Thomas Henry Birchall Scott, who had previously designed a number of Catholic churches in London, and was built by the local builder Glyn Davies. Local craftspeople also worked on elements of the church, including Mary Malburn who created the three painted lunettes, while Philip Lindsey Clark carved the stone reredos panel. According to the founding priest Fr. Malachy Lynch, the proportions were inspired by those of the theatre designed by Thomas S. Tait at Garthewin in Llanfair Talhaearn, Conwy County Borough, which boasted similar lunettes. The construction was funded by donations from both the local community and from Catholic schools and churches in Dublin, totalling £5000, with funds being raised by Fr. Lynch.

=== 1940–present ===
In 1940 the church was within the parish of Aberystwyth, from which it was founded; in 1947 it became the principal church of its own parish, Our Lady of Mount Carmel.

In 1965 the diocese of Menevia established the Charity for the Benefit of the Roman Catholic Church of Our Lady of Mount Carmel at Lampeter, and registered it with the Charity Commission for England and Wales. Its stated aim, as of 1976, was furthering religious, educational, and other charitable purposes of the Church of Our Lady of Mount Carmel. The church in Lampeter is still supported by this charity, although donations are at an all-time low, totalling only £172 in 2021.

In 2019 Our Lady of Mount Carmel in Lampeter hosted the 50th anniversary celebrations of the restoration of the British province of Carmelites with a Mass celebrated by Fr. Fernando Millán Romeral, the then Prior General of the Carmelite Order. The church was chosen in honour of its Carmelite origins, and for the significance of Wales in the re-establishment of the Carmelite Order in Britain.

== Architecture ==
=== Architect ===
In 1939 the church and attached presbytery were designed by the architect T. B. H. Scott. This London architect had previously worked on a number of Catholic churches, mostly in London, including the original St Bede's Church at Chadwell Heath, the Church of Our Lady of Muswell at Muswell Hill, the Church of Our Lady of the Immaculate Conception and St Joseph in Waltham Cross, and the original Church of St John Fisher in Shepperton. Prolific as he was, the Church of Our Lady of Mount Carmel, as a Grade II listed building, would seem to be amongst the best examples of his work.

=== Church ===
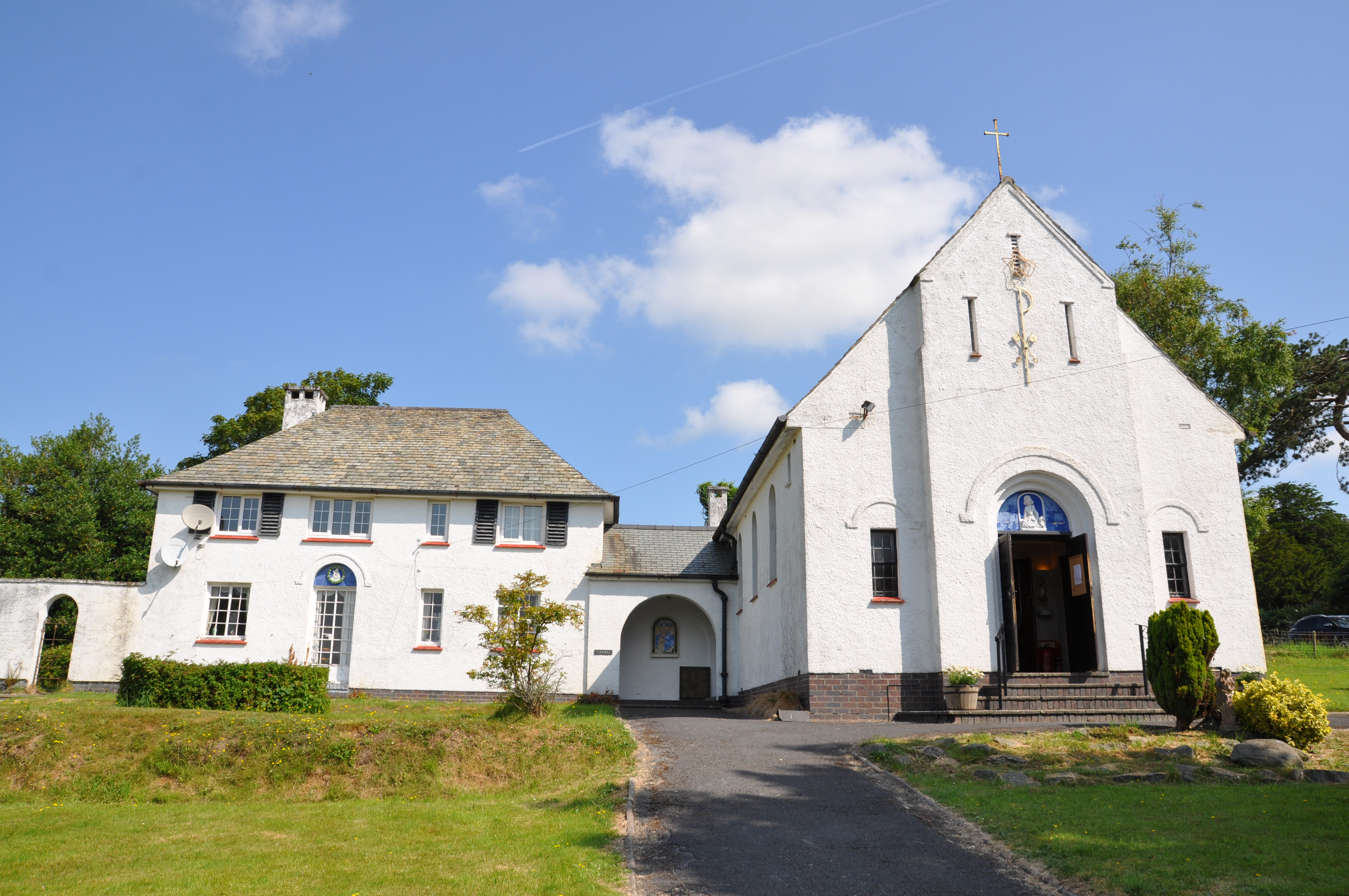
Exterior of the presbytery and church

The exterior's whitewashed walls and slate roofs are punctuated with a slate centrepiece, an iron cross finial, and an arched doorway led to by three steps beneath a hood mould. Above the doorway are a Della Robbia–style ceramic plaque in the lunette, two glazed loops on either side, and wrought-iron keys of Saint Peter.

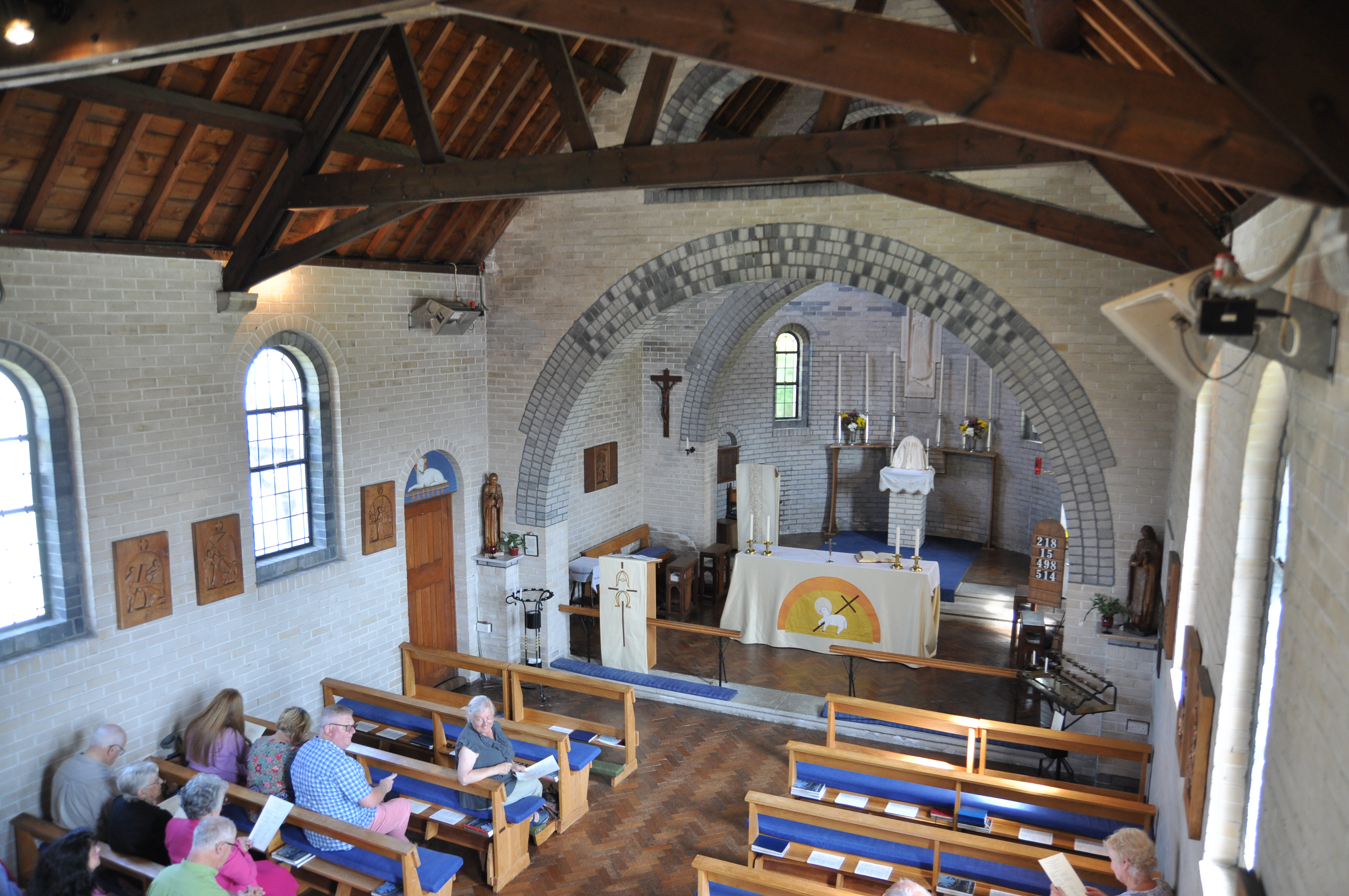
Interior of the church

The interior, meanwhile, contrasts complex divisions of space with simple materials; the chancel and apse are divided by identical cross-walls which give a view of the roof timbers. The walls are of a sand-coloured brick with grey brick elements seen in the lunette surrounds, the inner surrounds of the nave windows, the chancel and sanctuary arches, and the sanctuary wall which is semi-circular and entirely of grey brick.

The complex is built using traditional materials and forms, and serves as an example of mid-twentieth century architecture in west Wales.

== Parish ==
The Parish of Our Lady of Mount Carmel, of which the Church of Our Lady of Mount Carmel is the principal and only church, serves not just Lampeter, but also surrounding villages, farms, and tourist centres. Outside of religious holiday season, in which there may be more Masses, it offers four Masses a week, including Sunday Mass, in English, and a Mass every fortnight in Polish, serving multi-lingual congregations. In addition it serves the parish with "CAMEO", a gathering of congregants after Sunday Mass for tea and coffee, a Bible-reading group, to the congregation, during Mass, and Club 100, its fundraising initiative.
