= Tŷ Glyn =

Village in Ceredigion, Wales

Coordinates: 52.217080°N 4.199089°W

- Location within Ceredigion
- OS grid reference: SN 4986 5993
  - Cardiff: 67.1 mi (108.0 km)
  - London: 180.5 mi (290.5 km)
- Community: Ciliau Aeron
- Principal area: Ceredigion
- Country: Wales
- Sovereign state: United Kingdom
- Post town: Aberaeron
- Postcode district: SA48
- Police: Dyfed-Powys
- Fire: Mid and West Wales
- Ambulance: Welsh
- UK Parliament: Ceredigion Preseli
- Senedd Cymru – Welsh Parliament: Ceredigion

Tŷ Glyn, or Tyglyn, is a small village in the community of Ciliau Aeron, Ceredigion, Wales, which is 67.1 miles (107.9 km) from Cardiff and 180.5 miles (290.4 km) from London. Tŷ Glyn is represented in the Senedd by Elin Jones (Plaid Cymru) and is part of the Ceredigion Preseli constituency in the House of Commons.

== See also ==
- List of localities in Wales by population
