= Aberayron railway station =

Disused railway station in Ceredigion, Wales

Aberayron
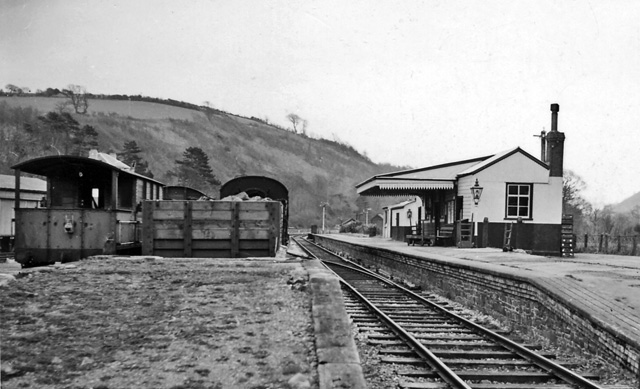
- Aberaeron station, 6 April 1958

General information
- Location: Aberaeron, Ceredigion; Wales
- Coordinates: 52.2376°N 4.2579°W
- Grid reference: SN459623
- Platforms: 1

Other information
- Status: Disused

History
- Opened: 12 May 1911
- Closed: 5 April 1965
- Original company: Lampeter, Aberayron and New Quay Light Railway
- Pre-grouping: Lampeter, Aberayron and New Quay Light Railway
- Post-grouping: Great Western Railway

Key dates
- 12 February 1951: Closed (last passenger train)
- 7 May 1951: Closed for passengers (official)
Location

Aberayron railway station in Aberaeron was the terminus of the Lampeter, Aberayron and New Quay Light Railway branch line of the Carmarthen to Aberystwyth Line in Ceredigion, Wales. The branch diverged from the through line at Lampeter.

== History ==
The station was incorporated into the Great Western Railway during the Grouping of 1923, passing on to the Western Region of British Railways on nationalisation in 1948. Passenger services were discontinued in 1951 and freight in 1963. The station was host to a GWR camp coach from 1934 to 1939. A camping coach was also positioned here by the Western Region from 1952 to 1956, the coach was joined by another so there were two coaches from 1957 to 1962.

The last freight train left Aberaeron on 2 April 1965. The station site was later built over for commercial use.

| Preceding station | Disused railways | Following station |
|---|---|---|
| Llanerch-Ayron | Great Western Railway; Lampeter, Aberayron and New Quay Light Railway | Terminus |
