= Llanerchaeron =

- Llanayron House
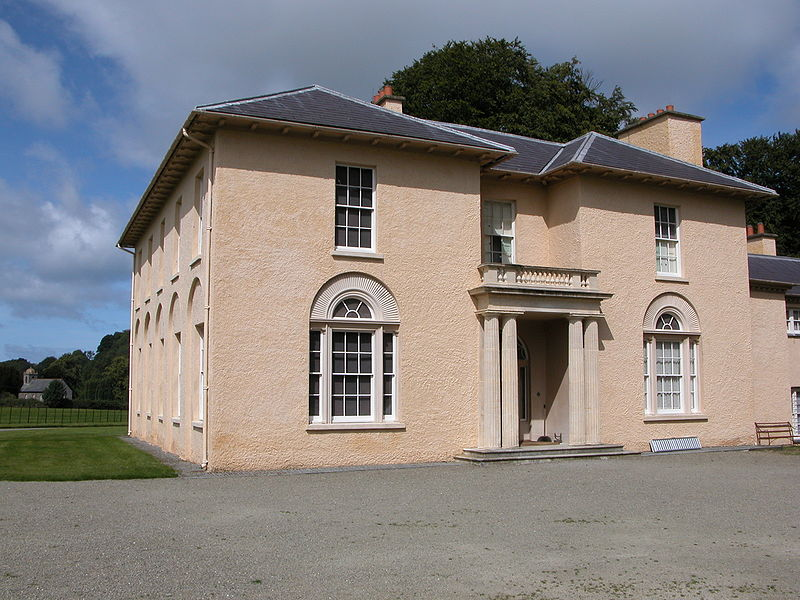

- Location within Wales
- 52.21833°N 4.22472°W
- Type: House
- Location: Aberaeron, Ceredigion

History
- Built: 1790s

Site notes
- Architect: John Nash
- Architectural style: Regency villa
- Owner: National Trust

Listed Building – Grade I
- Official name: Llanerchaeron (previously listed as Llanaeron House)
- Designated: 1964
- Reference no.: 10715

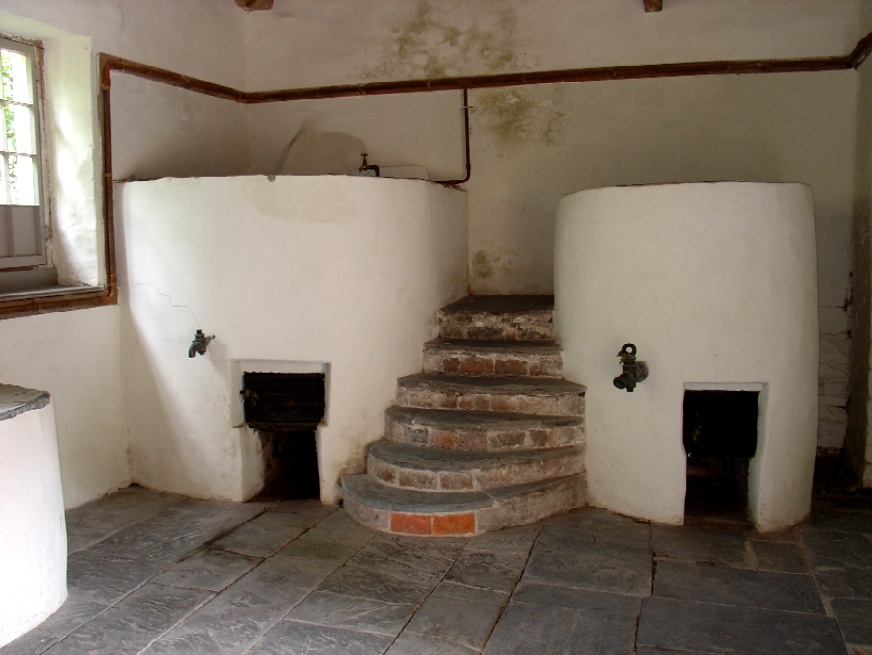
Brewing room where various styles of beers were made and piped underground to the house

Llanerchaeron, known as "Llanayron House" to its nineteenth-century occupants, is a grade I listed mansion on the River Aeron, designed and built in 1795 by John Nash for Major (later Colonel) William Lewis as a model self-sufficient farm complex located near Ciliau Aeron, some 2 1/2 miles south-east of Aberaeron, Ceredigion, Wales. There is evidence that the house replaced an earlier mansion. A later owner, William Lewes, was the husband of Colonel Lewis's inheriting daughter.

The estate is now in the care of the National Trust. The gardens and the parkland are listed on the Cadw/ICOMOS Register of Parks and Gardens of Special Historic Interest in Wales. The neighbouring parish church of St Non – also redesigned by Nash – has registers of baptisms and burials dating from 1730 and marriages from 1754.

== Service facilities ==
Much of the historical value derives from the indifference shown by past owners to the farm and outbuildings, which were allowed to remain unimproved and generally untouched with no attempt to demolish or renovate them. As a result it is easy to see and infer exactly where and how essential tasks were performed, often aided by advanced technology, including electricity generated by a water-wheel.

The service facilities include a large laundry and linen-care room, spaces for brewing, butter and cheese making, preparation and salting or smoking of meat and fish, preservation of fruits and vegetables, and a full range of crafts. The estate employed carpenters and a full-time stonemason who designed and built whole buildings as well as overseeing the construction of walls, drying platforms, and other farm requisites.

== Walled gardens ==
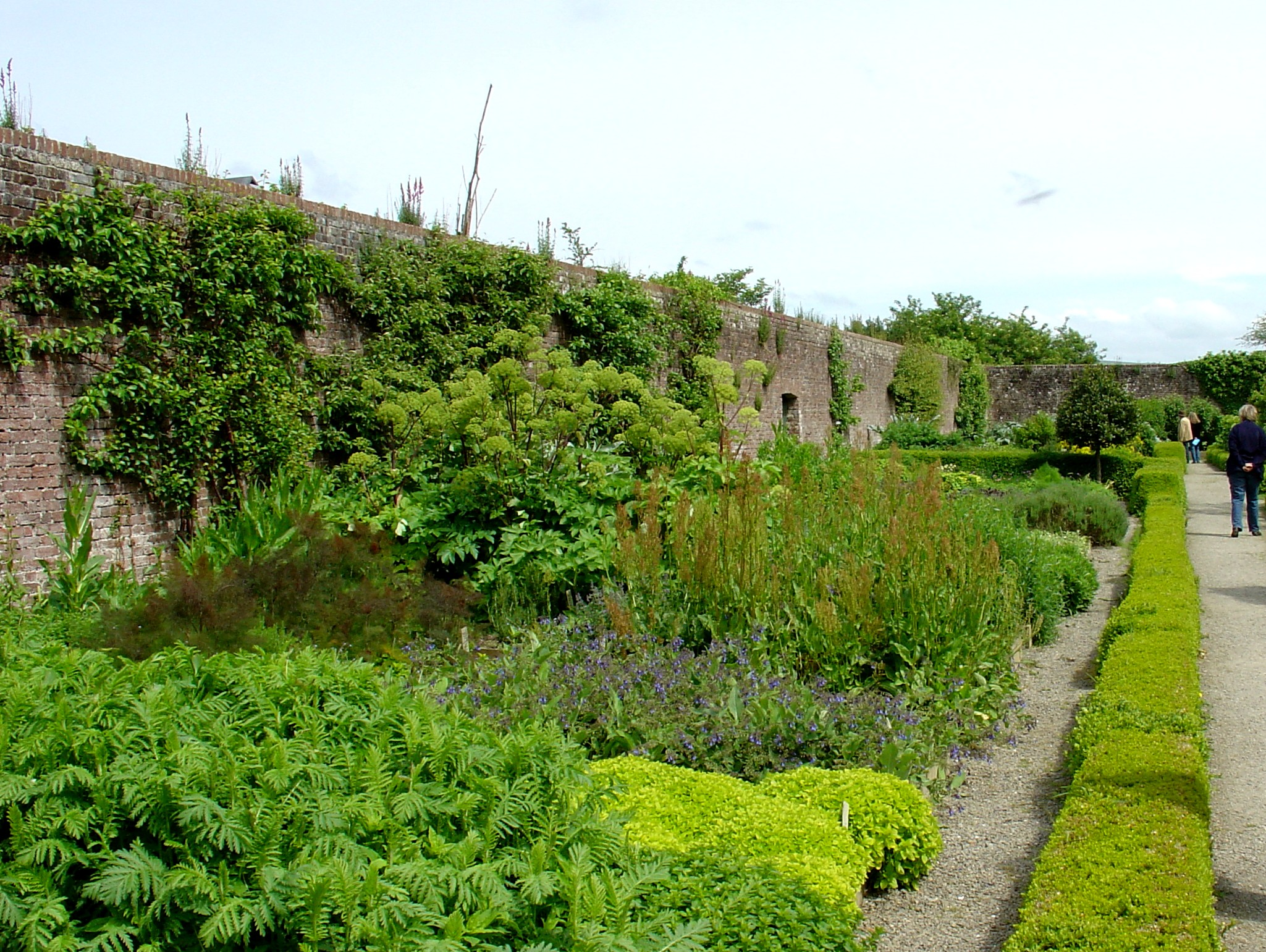
Part of the walled garden

Llanerchaeron's walled gardens are home to dozens of veteran fruit trees, some 200 years old, which are part of the working farm's ongoing organic production. These trees are also important hosts for all kinds of insects, mosses and lichens, and, coupled with the traditional vegetable and herbaceous flower beds, they are a significant wildlife habitat. The gardens and the parkland are designated Grade II on the Cadw/ICOMOS Register of Parks and Gardens of Special Historic Interest in Wales.

== Public access ==
The estate's former tenant farmland has now mostly been sold but the house and a considerable area of farm, garden, and parkland are opened to the public at limited hours for most of the year, but pre-booking is recommended, especially at busier times such as weekends and bank holidays. The Dylan Thomas Trail also passes the estate.

=== 2010 eisteddfod ===
Llanerchaeron estate played host to some 100,000 visitors during the 2010 youth cultural festival, the Urdd National Eisteddfod, held between 31 May and 5 June 2010. This compared with the normal attendance rate of about 35,000 visitors annually.

Archaeological find

Work in preparation for the eisteddfod was temporarily halted by the discovery of medieval relics below the ground. This tallied with established knowledge of a large medieval settlement. (See reference below.) There were also anxieties over the possibility of disturbing the habitat of otters.

== St Non Church ==
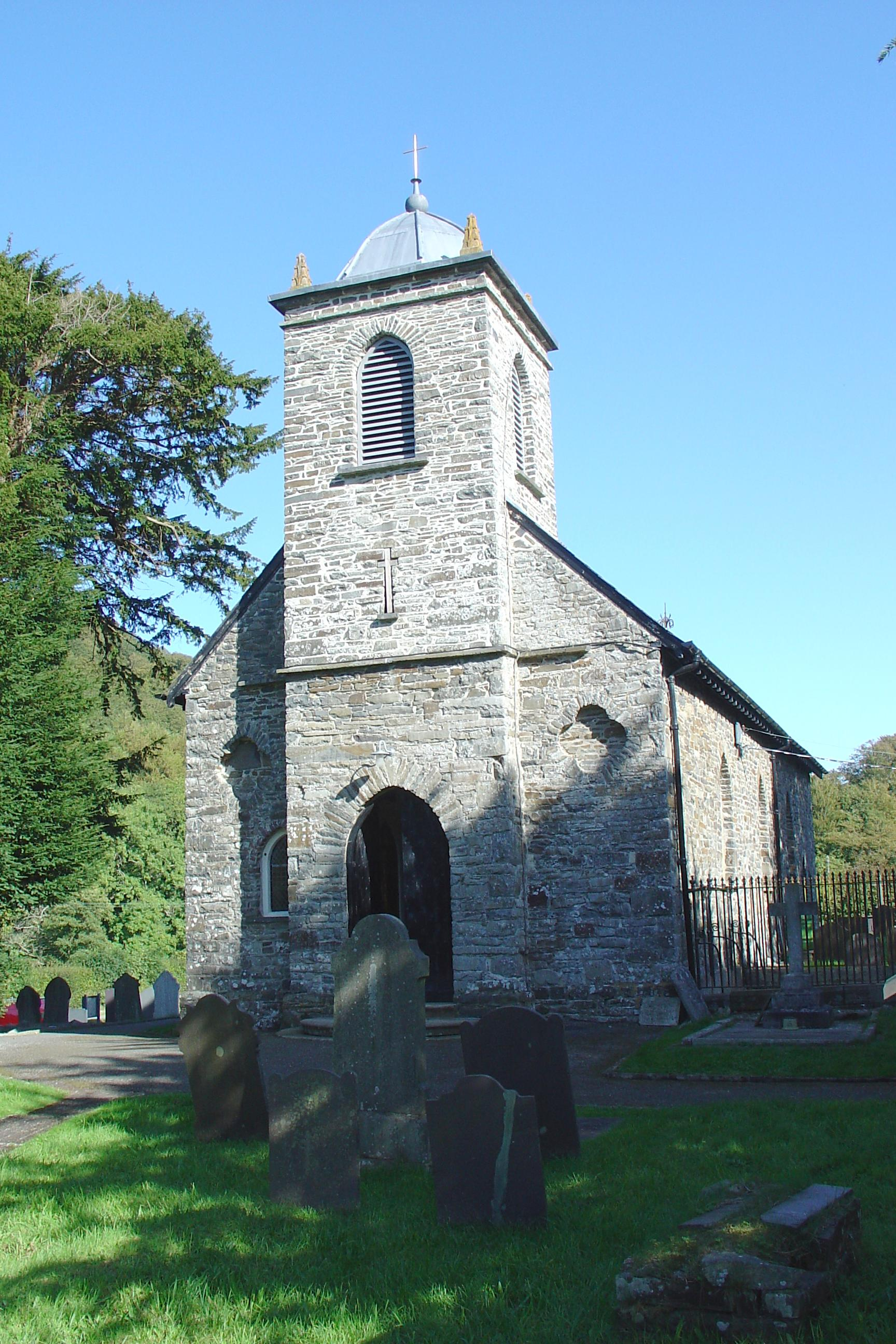
St Non Church in 2009

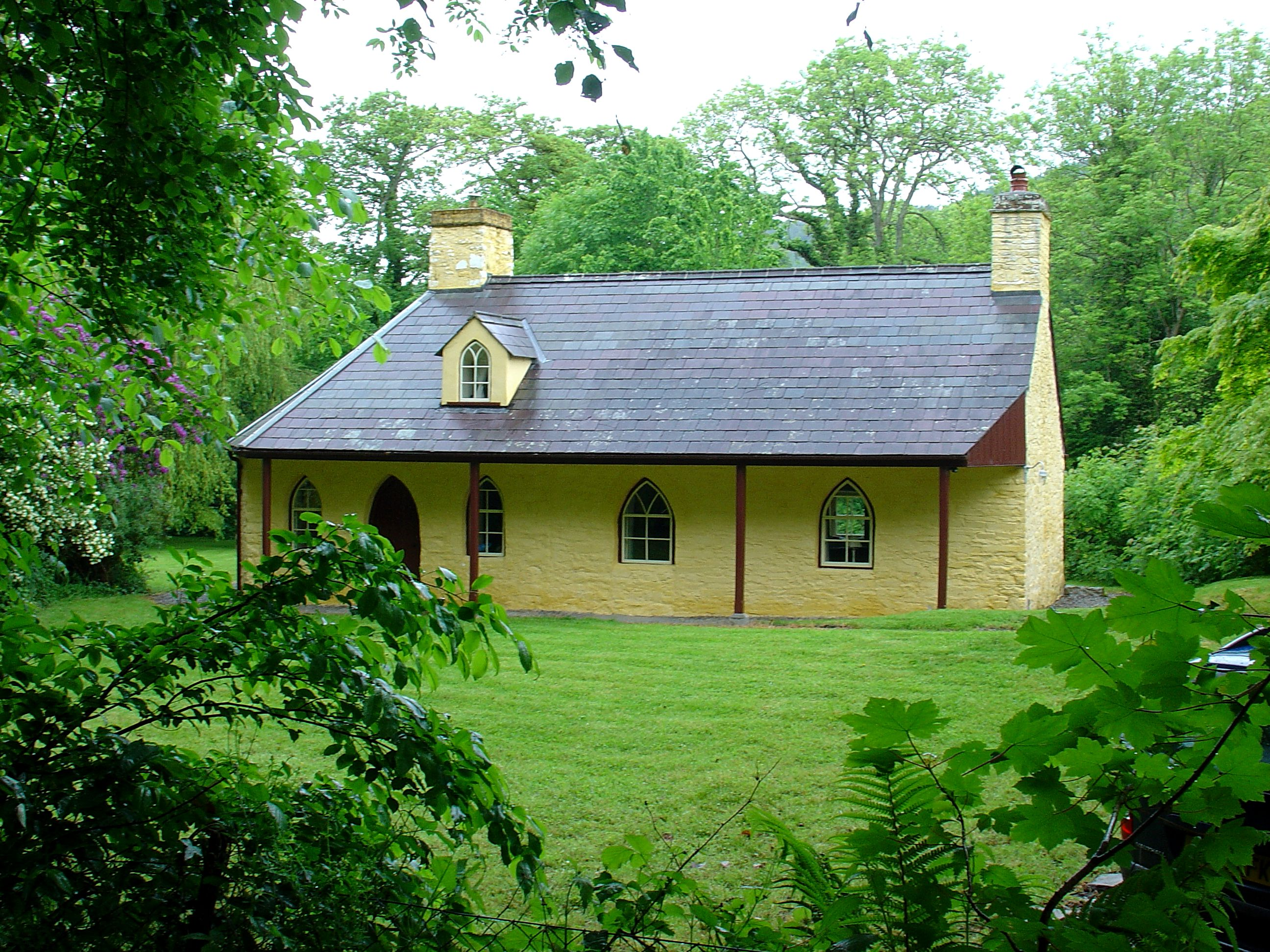
Coachman's cottage by Nash, who probably remodelled the church

The parish church of Llannerchaeron dates back to at least 1284 in the reign of Edward I, when there was a large medieval village in the adjoining parkland which seems to have been deserted around 1500. The cost of the church's remodelling (forty pounds) was met by parishioners, underwritten by Major Lewis. There is no documentation to prove the work was designed by John Nash but it was discussed by a minuted public vestry meeting in 1796, within a year of the completion of Llanayron House. Nash is known to have at least aided design of other peripheral buildings, a minister's house and a coachman's house not far from the church. The internal restoration of the church was paid for in 1878 by Mary Ashby Lewis, the daughter-in-law of William Lewis, who was widowed for 62 years and died in 1917 aged 104. When her husband John had been interred in the family vault on 13 July 1855, it was diaried by an Aberaeron chemist that "There were nine other coffins there; some had been there over 100 years". Since the 1920 disestablishment, the church belongs to the Church in Wales.

== Footnotes ==
=== Principal sources ===
- Evans N, The Llanerchaeron Estate; The built environments, building descriptions and evaluations (1998): unpublished document, National Trust
- Laidlaw R & Palmer C Historic park and garden survey, Llanerchaeron (1998): unpublished document, National Trust
- Lloyd T, Untitled paper (1990): with Cadw: Welsh Historic Monuments, Cardiff
- Tithe Award Survey and Schedule of Apportionments (1839): National Library of Wales, Aberystwyth.
- Evans Mair Lloyd Llanerchaeron, a tale of 10 generations 1634-1989 (1996).
- "Llanerchaeron, including rear Service Courtyard Ranges (previously listed as Llanaeron House), Ciliau Aeron". British Listed Buildings.

== See also ==
- List of gardens in Wales
- Grade I listed buildings in Ceredigion
- List of National Trust properties in Wales
