= Lampeter =

Town in Wales

Lampeter: Welsh: Llanbedr Pont Steffan
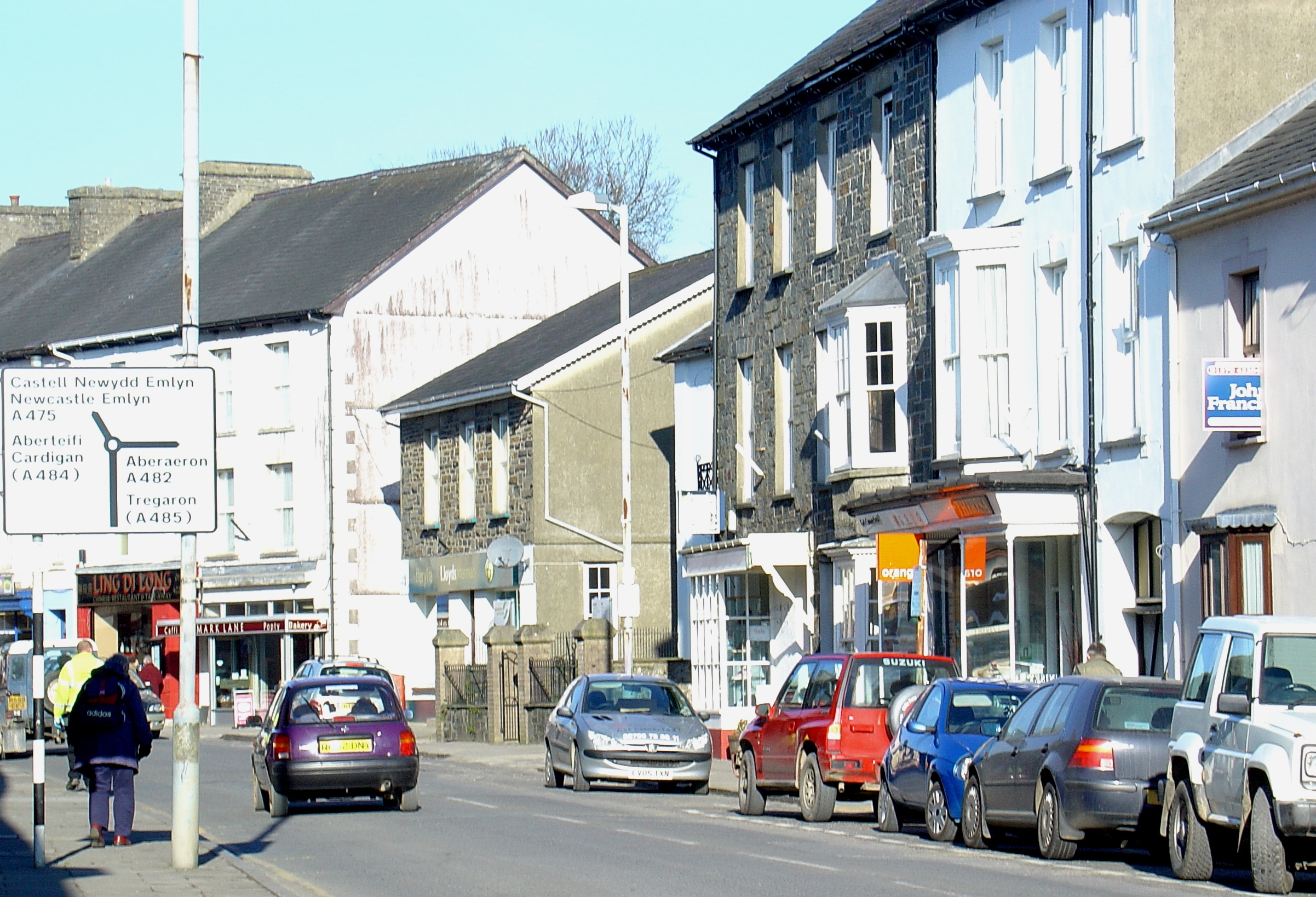

- Location within Ceredigion
- Population: 2,970 (2011)
- OS grid reference: SN578478
- Community: Lampeter
- Principal area: Ceredigion
- Preserved county: Dyfed
- Country: Wales
- Sovereign state: United Kingdom
- Post town: LAMPETER
- Postcode district: SA48
- Dialling code: 01570
- Police: Dyfed-Powys
- Fire: Mid and West Wales
- Ambulance: Welsh
- UK Parliament: Ceredigion Preseli
- Senedd Cymru – Welsh Parliament: Ceredigion Penfro
- List of places UK Wales Ceredigion 52.1202°N 4.0821°W Community map: Map of the community

Lampeter (/ˈlæmpətər/; Welsh: Llanbedr Pont Steffan (formal); Llambed (colloquial)) is a town and community in Ceredigion, Wales, at the confluence of the Afon Dulas with the River Teifi. It is the third largest urban area in Ceredigion, after Aberystwyth and Cardigan, and had a campus of the University of Wales Trinity Saint David. At the 2011 Census, the population was 2,970. Lampeter was also a university town.

== Etymology ==
The Welsh name of the town, Llanbedr Pont Steffan, means "Peter's church [at] Stephen's bridge" in reference to its church and castle. Its English name derives from this, as does the colloquial Welsh name Llambed. An alternative English spelling occurs as "Thlampetre" in 1433.

== History ==
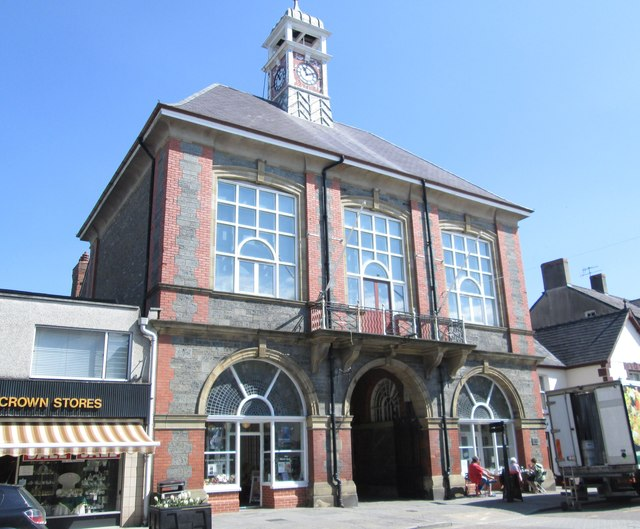
Lampeter Town Hall

The Norman timber castle of Pont Steffan ("Stephen's bridge" in English) occupying a strategic position beside the River Teifi was destroyed in 1187 after it had been conquered by Owain Gwynedd and was not rebuilt.

Cardiganshire was one of the royal counties established by Edward I after the defeat of Llywelyn ap Gruffudd (Llywelyn Ein Llyw Olaf) at Cilmeri in 1282, when Lampeter fell under direct royal control. But this had little effect on the town, and the Welsh language and culture continued to thrive. The first market charter was granted in 1284 to Rhys ap Meredydd who was given the right to hold a weekly market. As many as eight fairs were also held each year under successive charters.

The town was ruled by a local aristocracy who lived in elegant mansions, including Brynhywel, Maesyfelin and the Lloyd baronets of Peterwell. As magistrates, they handed out the severest of penalties to offenders. The fairs and markets had become rowdy occasions with violence and drunkenness, and the stocks and whipping post in front of Lampeter Town Hall were frequently put to use in the 18th century.

The town developed the crafts, services and industries to cater to the needs of the rural area. There were several woollen mills, one of which in the mid-18th century was already producing the complex double-woven tapestry cloth later to become associated with the Welsh woollen industry. There were also blacksmiths, a leather tannery, carpenters, saddlers, bootmakers and hatters. The town was one of the main centres on the Welsh drovers' road which carried cattle and sheep on foot to the markets in England. A large number of inns point to the town's importance as a rural centre.

Lampeter's war memorial, sculpted by Sir William Goscombe John (1860–1952), was unveiled in September 1921.

== University ==
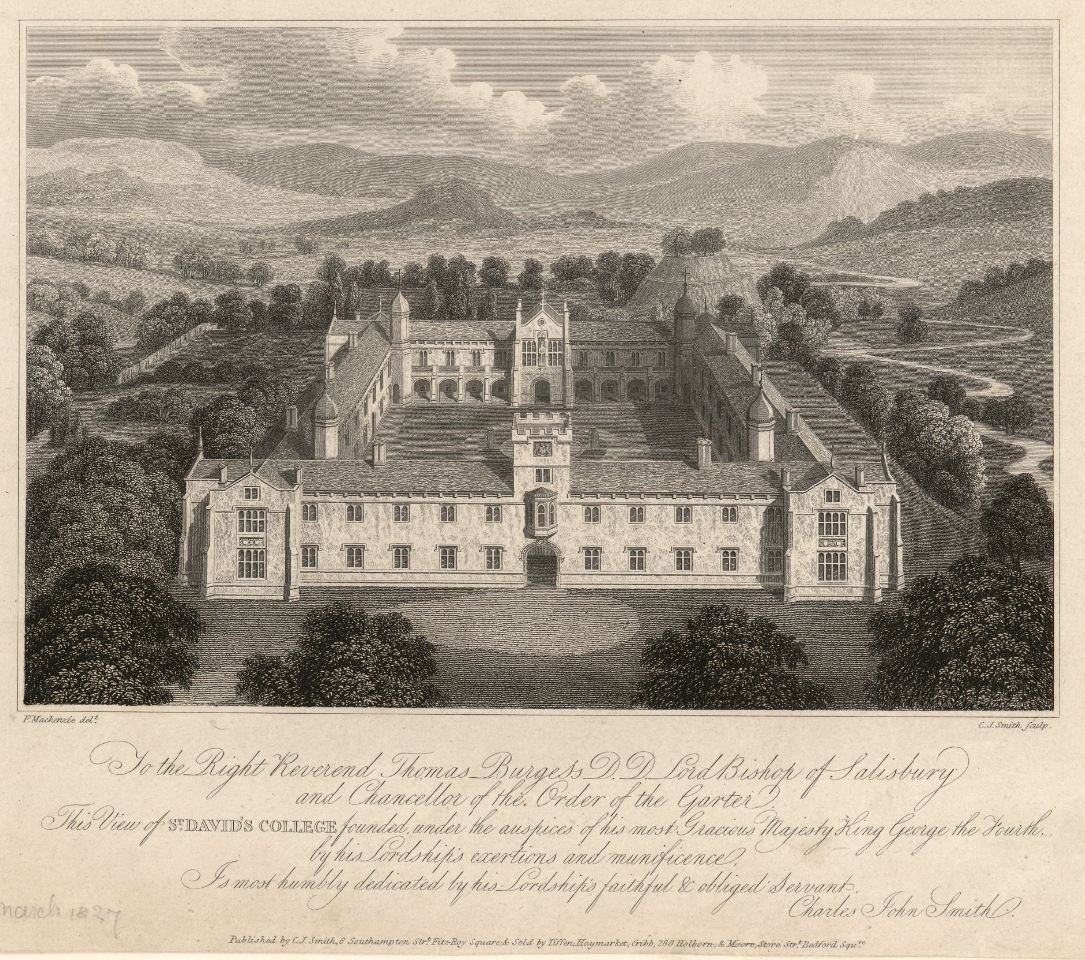
The college c. 1835

St David's College was founded in Lampeter in 1822 by Thomas Burgess, Bishop of St David's, to provide training for those wishing to join the Anglican priesthood. It was the first institution of higher education in Wales and the fourth oldest in England and Wales after Oxford, Cambridge, and Northampton. In 1852 it was granted a charter to award the Bachelor of Divinity (BD) degree, and in 1865 another charter enabled it to confer BA degrees in liberal arts. Its central building, based on an Oxbridge-style quadrangle, was designed by Charles Robert Cockerell.

In 1971, it became a constituent part of the University of Wales as St David's University College and was renamed the University of Wales, Lampeter, in 1996. In 2008, the Lampeter institution's original charter was used to reform higher education in West Wales with the integration of Trinity College Carmarthen, further education colleges in Cardigan and Llanelli, and the technical college known as Swansea Metropolitan into the University of Wales Trinity Saint David.

In January 2025 Trinity St David finalised plans to stop using the Lampeter campus for university teaching and relocate its courses, staff and students to Carmarthen.

The university's Rugby Union team was the first in Wales. It was formed in the 1850s by Rowland Williams who introduced the game from Cambridge.

== Governance ==
There are two tiers of local government covering Lampeter, at community (town) and county level: Lampeter Town Council (Cyngor Tref Llanbedr Pont Steffan) and Ceredigion County Council (Cyngor Sir Ceredigion). The town council meets at the Creuddyn Building on Pontfaen Road.

=== Administrative history ===
Lampeter was an ancient parish, which included rural areas as well as the town itself. The town was administered as a borough from at least the time of Edward II (reigned 1307–1327). A government survey of boroughs in 1835 found that the borough corporation had very few powers. The borough was therefore left unreformed when the Municipal Corporations Act 1835 reformed most ancient boroughs across the country into municipal boroughs.

The old corporation continued to operate, but was ineligible to take on any further functions. In order to provide more modern forms of local government, a local government district was created in 1866 with an elected local board. The local board and old borough corporation then existed alongside each other until 1884, when the town was issued a new municipal charter formally incorporating it as a municipal borough. The reformed borough council took on the functions of the abolished local board. The Local Government Act 1894 directed that parishes were no longer allowed to straddle borough boundaries, and so the parts of Lampeter parish outside the borough became a separate parish called Lampeter Rural. Lampeter Rural was abolished in 1987 and divided between several neighbouring communities.

The borough of Lampeter was abolished in 1974 under the Local Government Act 1972. A community called Lampeter was created instead, covering the area of the abolished borough. District-level functions passed to Ceredigion District Council, which was in turn replaced in 1996 by Ceredigion County Council.

== Religious sites ==
Lampeter Orthodox Church

Lampeter holds Ceredigion's only Eastern Orthodox church: the Lampeter Orthodox Church (Welsh: Eglwys Uniongred Llanbed).

== Culture ==
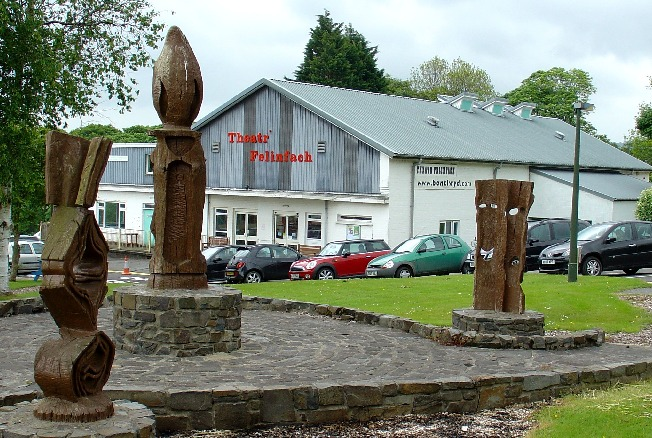
Theatr Felinfach

- Lampeter's local Eisteddfod, Eisteddfod Rhys Thomas James Pantyfedwen, is held annually over the August bank holiday. It is particularly noteworthy for its competition for singers under the age of 30, colloquially known as Llais Llwyfan Llambed ('the voice of Lampeter's stage').
- Lampeter Museum covers the cultural and agricultural development of the town as well as the history of the college.
- Theatr Felinfach, a small regional theatre located outside the village of Ystrad Aeron in Dyffryn Aeron, about 7 miles from Lampeter.
- During the Second World War, Dylan Thomas and his wife Caitlin lived at Plas Gelli, a secluded mansion just outside Talsarn. The Dylan Thomas Trail links Talsarn and Lampeter with the other places in Ceredigion associated with the poet, such as Aberaeron and New Quay.
- In 1968, William Julian Cayo-Evans first marched his paramilitary nationalist 'Free Wales Army' from Lampeter.
- The Church of Our Lady of Mount Carmel, a Roman Catholic Church, is Grade II listed and is considered a fine example of mid-20th century church architecture.

== Notable people ==
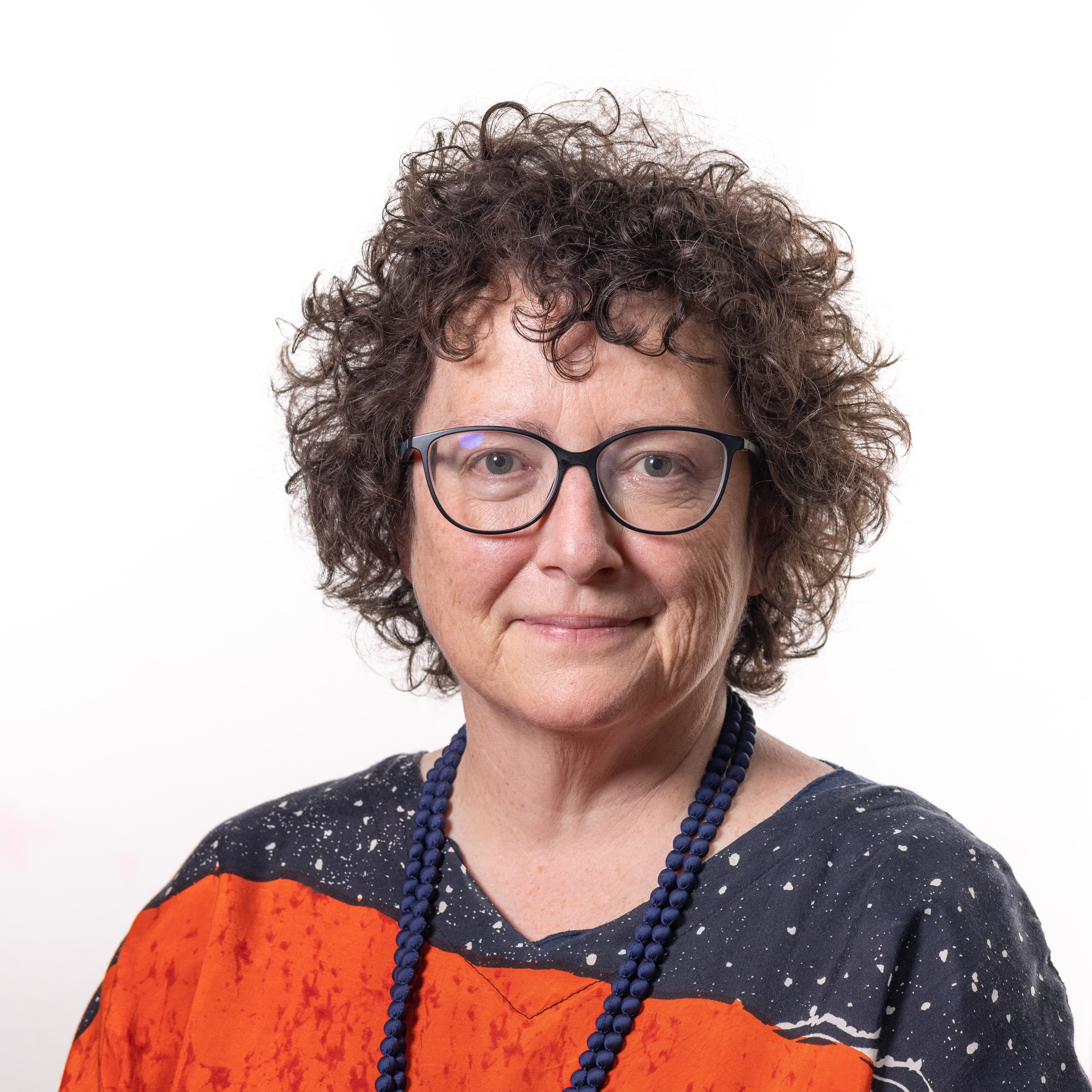
Elin Jones, 2021

- Eliezer Griffiths (1827–1920), a Congregationalist minister, worked in Australia and America
- David Thomas (1829–1905), a Welsh clergyman helped found a Welsh church in the Welsh settlement in Argentina.
- John Perowne (1863–1954), a British Army officer and a King's Messenger
- Watcyn Samuel Jones (1877–1964), agricultural administrator and theological college principal.
- Glyn Daniel (1914 in Lampeter Velfrey – 1986), a Welsh scientist and archaeologist who taught the European Neolithic period
- Julian Cayo-Evans (1937-1995), a Welsh nationalist and republican.
- Gillian Elisa (born 1953), a Welsh actress, singer and comedian.
- Elin Jones (born 1966), politician, the Llywydd of the Senedd (presiding officer) since 2016.

== Sport ==
Lampeter has a strong sporting community, which includes Cwmann and Llanybydder. Many sports are played in the town, with rugby union being the most popular. Lampeter fielded the first rugby union team in Wales. The sport is believed to have arrived in the late 1840s, meaning the town has a very long tie and history with the sport. The town is represented by Lampeter Town Rugby which is a member of the Welsh Rugby Union and is a feeder club for the Llanelli Scarlets.

Many other sports are played in the town, including association football, with the town being represented by a football team, their pitch being directly next to the main pitch of Lampeter Rugby Club. The football team has junior teams as well as a 1st and 2nd team. The town is served by a leisure centre, which has a gym, the main hall and modern tennis facilities. The town has a swimming pool and also a bowling green.

== Transport ==
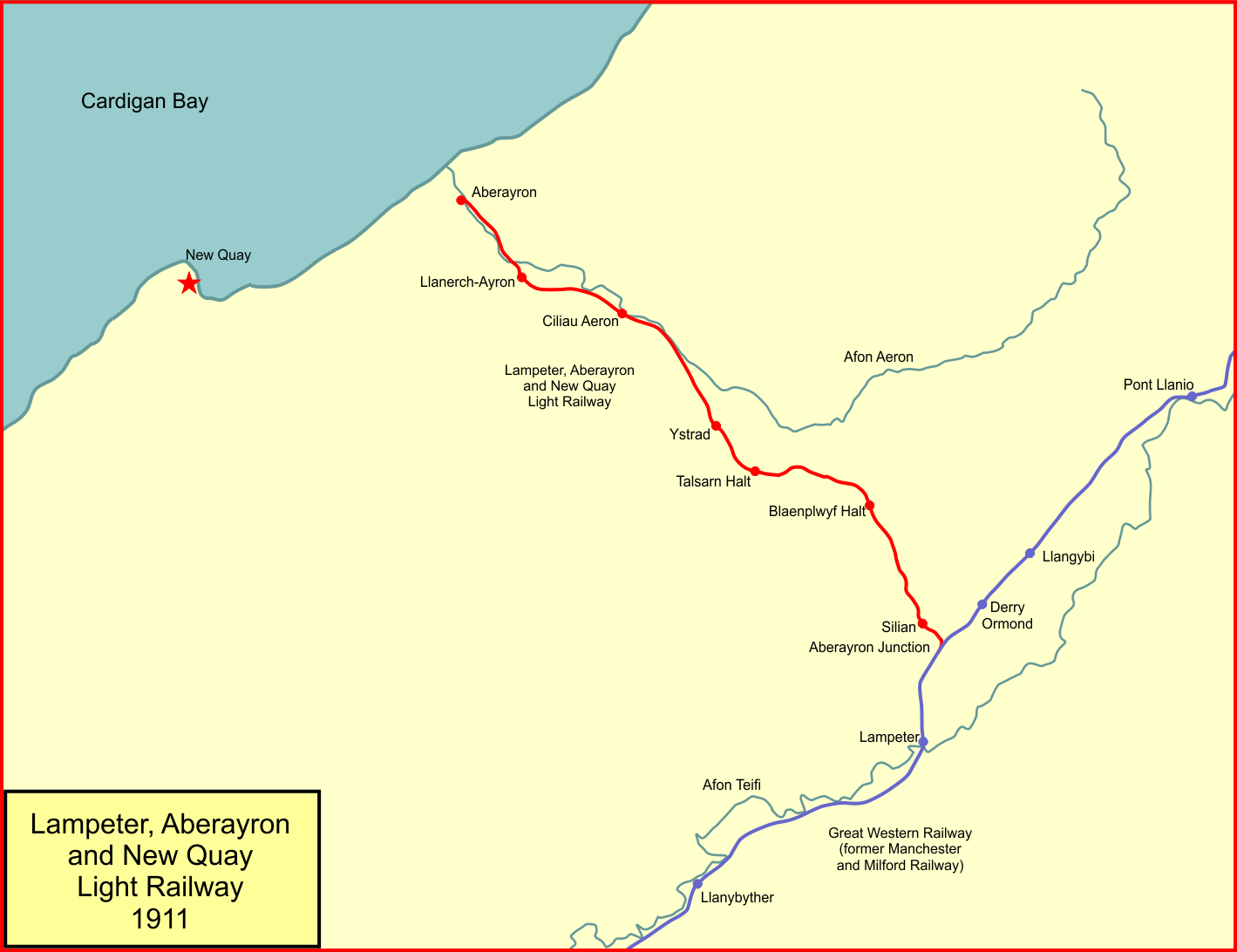
In 1911, a branch line opened to Aberaeron

In 1866, transport in Lampeter was greatly improved with the opening of the railway linking Carmarthen and Aberystwyth. In 1911, a branch line opened to Aberaeron. Following the nationalisation of the railways, the passenger service to Aberaeron ceased in 1951. Passenger trains on the main line to Carmarthen and Aberystwyth continued until December 1964 when the track was badly damaged by flooding south of Aberystwyth and through trains were suspended. This was the era of the "Beeching Axe" and it took little political persuasion to decide that the cost of repairs would be unjustified. The remaining passenger services were withdrawn. Milk trains continued to the processing factories at Pont Llanio until 1970, and Felinfach until 1973. The line was eventually lifted in 1975. However, the section of the old line between Bronwydd Arms and Danycoed Halt still exists and is used by the Gwili Railway, a steam railway preservation society which operates a regular timetable during summer months.

Regular bus services operate through the town, connecting Lampeter to Aberystwyth, Carmarthen and Swansea. Two buses a day continue beyond Swansea, providing a through service to Cardiff.

== Twinning ==
Lampeter is twinned with Saint-Germain-sur-Moine, France.

== See also ==
- All Saints' Church, Cellan
