= 1904 Cardiganshire County Council election =

1904 Welsh local election

The sixth election for Cardiganshire County Council took place in March 1904. They were preceded by the 1901 election and followed by the 1907 election

== Overview of the result ==
The election was dominated by the controversy over the Education Act and the funding of church schools. In some quarters, candidates were described as 'Progressive' or 'Sectarian' rather than on party lines. However, as in previous elections, there was a large Liberal majority, which was assured once the unopposed returns had been confirmed.

== Unopposed returns ==
There were a large number of unopposed returns.

== Gains and losses ==
A few seats were lost by Liberals.

== Contested elections ==
contested elections were mostly won by Liberals.

== Retiring aldermen ==
Eight aldermen retired, all of whom were Liberals apart from Sir Marteine Lloyd. Peter Jones, J.M. Howell, Walter T. Davies and the Rev T. Mason Jones stood in the election but were not re-elected aldermen. Sir Marteine Lloyd, Evan Richards and Rev John Williams were re-elected without facing the electorate. John Powell stood down.

== The new council ==
Cardiganshire County Council 1904 : elected members
Party	Seats	Gains	Losses	Net gain/loss	Seats %	Votes %	Votes	+/−
Liberal								
Conservative								
Liberal Unionist								
Independent								

Cardiganshire County Council 1904 : elected members and sitting aldermen
Party	Seats	Gains	Losses	Net gain/loss	Seats %	Votes %	Votes	+/−
Liberal								
Conservative								
Liberal Unionist								
Independent								

Cardiganshire County Council 1904 : following election of new aldermen and by-elections
Party	Seats	Gains	Losses	Net gain/loss	Seats %	Votes %	Votes	+/−
Liberal								
Conservative								
Liberal Unionist								
Independent								

== Division results ==
=== Aberaeron ===
Aberaeron 1904
Party	Candidate	Votes	%	±%
Liberal	J. Lima Jones*	168		
Liberal	D. Jones	100		
Majority		68		
Liberal hold		Swing		

=== Aberbanc ===
Aberbanc 1904
Party	Candidate	Votes	%	±%
Liberal	Evan Davies*	unopposed		
Liberal hold		Swing		

=== Aberporth ===
Aberporth 1904
Party	Candidate	Votes	%	±%
Liberal	Thomas Watkins*	84		
Liberal	Joshua Hughes	60		
Majority		68		
Liberal hold		Swing		

=== Aberystwyth Division 1 ===
Aberystwyth Division 1 1904
Party	Candidate	Votes	%	±%
Unionist	R.J. Jones*	unopposed		
Unionist hold		Swing		

=== Aberystwyth Division 2 ===
Aberystwyth Division 2 1904
Party	Candidate	Votes	%	±%
Liberal	D.C. Roberts*	unopposed		
Liberal hold		Swing		

=== Aberystwyth Division 3 ===
Aberystwyth Division 3 1904
Party	Candidate	Votes	%	±%
Liberal	Robert Ellis*	172		
Liberal hold		Swing		

=== Aberystwyth Division 4 ===
Aberystwyth Division 4 1901
Party	Candidate	Votes	%	±%
Liberal	E.H. James*	unopposed		
Liberal hold		Swing		

=== Aeron ===
J.M. Howell, whose term as alderman had come to an end, was elected unopposed for a seat that was previously held by a Conservative.

Aeron 1904
Party	Candidate	Votes	%	±%
Liberal	John Morgan Howell**	Unopposed	N/A	N/A
Liberal gain from Conservative				

=== Borth ===
Borth 1901
Party	Candidate	Votes	%	±%
Conservative	Richard James	unopposed		
Conservative hold		Swing		

=== Bow Street ===
Bow Street 1904
Party	Candidate	Votes	%	±%
Liberal	A. Howell	119		
Conservative	Henry Bonsall*	72		
Majority		47		
Liberal gain from Ind. Conservative		Swing		

=== Cardigan North ===
Cardigan North 1904
Party	Candidate	Votes	%	±%
Liberal	O. Beynon Evans*	unopposed		
Liberal hold		Swing		

=== Cardigan South ===
Cardigan South 1901
Party	Candidate	Votes	%	±%
Liberal	James Stephens*	unopposed		
Liberal hold		Swing		

=== Cilcennin ===
Cilcennin 1904
Party	Candidate	Votes	%	±%
Liberal	Dr Jenkin Lewis	unopposed		
Liberal hold		Swing		

=== Cwmrheidol ===
Cwmrheidol 1904
Party	Candidate	Votes	%	±%
Liberal	William Evans*	unopposed		
Liberal hold		Swing		

=== Devil's Bridge ===
Devil's Bridge 1904
Party	Candidate	Votes	%	±%
Liberal	Rev T. Mason Jones**	unopposed		
Liberal hold		Swing		

=== Felinfach ===
Llanfihangel Ystrad 1901
Party	Candidate	Votes	%	±%
Liberal	Walter Thomas Davies**	135		
Liberal	John Jones	98		
Unionist	D. Jones	75		
Majority		23		
Liberal hold		Swing		

=== Goginan ===
Goginan 1904
Party	Candidate	Votes	%	±%
Liberal	Joseph Parry	unopposed		
Liberal gain from Conservative		Swing		

=== Lampeter Borough ===
Lampeter Borough 1904
Party	Candidate	Votes	%	±%
Conservative	Rev Ll.J. Bebb	210		
Liberal	Rev R.C. Jones	182		
Majority		28		
Conservative hold		Swing		

=== Llanarth ===
Llanarth 1904
Party	Candidate	Votes	%	±%
Liberal	Morgan Evans*	unopposed		
Liberal hold		Swing		

=== Llanbadarn Fawr ===
Llanbadarn Fawr 1904
Party	Candidate	Votes	%	±%
Conservative	J.J. Bonsall*	unopposed		
Conservative hold		Swing		

=== Llanddewi Brefi ===
Llanddewi Brefi 1904
Party	Candidate	Votes	%	±%
Unionist	R.S. Rowland	136		
Liberal	David Davies*	115		
Majority		68		
Unionist gain from Liberal		Swing		

=== Llandygwydd ===
Llandygwydd 1904
Party	Candidate	Votes	%	±%
Liberal	Thomas Evans	181		
Conservative	E. Williams	85		
Majority		96		
Liberal hold		Swing		

=== Llandysul North ===
Llandysul North 1904
Party	Candidate	Votes	%	±%
Liberal	Jenkin Jones	147		
Liberal hold		Swing		

=== Llandysul South ===
Llandysul South 1904
Party	Candidate	Votes	%	±%
Liberal	William Davies	unopposed		
Liberal hold		Swing		

=== Llansysiliogogo ===
Llansysiliogogo 1904
Party	Candidate	Votes	%	±%
Liberal	Tom Parry	unopposed		
Liberal hold		Swing		

=== Llanfair Clydogau ===
Llanfair Clydogau 1904
Party	Candidate	Votes	%	±%
Liberal	D.S. Davies	176		
Unionist	William Rees*	93		
Majority		83		
Liberal gain from Unionist		Swing		

=== Llanfarian ===
Llanfarian 1904
Party	Candidate	Votes	%	±%
Liberal	Vaughan Davies	Unopposed	N/A	N/A
Liberal hold				

=== Llanfihangel y Creuddyn ===
Llanfihangel y Creuddyn 1904
Party	Candidate	Votes	%	±%
Liberal	David Morgans	unopposed		
Liberal hold		Swing		

=== Llangoedmor ===
Llangoedmor 1904
Party	Candidate	Votes	%	±%
Liberal	D. Samuel Jones	140		
Liberal	D. Samuel Jones	70		
Majority		68		
Liberal hold		Swing		

=== Llangeitho ===
Llangeitho 1904
Party	Candidate	Votes	%	±%
Liberal	Thomas Davies*	unopposed		
Liberal hold		Swing		

=== Llangrannog ===
Llangrannog 1904
Party	Candidate	Votes	%	±%
Liberal	Thomas Evans*	unopposed		
Liberal hold		Swing		

=== Llanilar ===
Llanilar 1904
Party	Candidate	Votes	%	±%
Liberal	Benjamin Jones*	unopposed		
Liberal hold		Swing		

=== Llanrhystyd ===
Llanrhystyd 1904
Party	Candidate	Votes	%	±%
Liberal	E.J. Evans	139		
Conservative	D. Morgan James*	129		
Liberal gain from Conservative		Swing		

=== Llanllwchaiarn ===
Llanllwchaiarn 1904
Party	Candidate	Votes	%	±%
Liberal	Evan Lewis	110		
Liberal	Rev D. Evans	45		
Majority		68		
Liberal hold		Swing		

=== Llansantffraed ===
Llansantffraed 1904
Party	Candidate	Votes	%	±%
Conservative	Evan James Price	unopposed		
Conservative hold		Swing		

=== Llanwnen ===
Llanwnen 1904
Party	Candidate	Votes	%	±%
Liberal	David Evans	unopposed		
Liberal hold		Swing		

=== Llanwenog ===
Llanwenog 1904
Party	Candidate	Votes	%	±%
Liberal	James Jones*	unopposed		
Liberal hold		Swing		

=== Lledrod ===
Lledrod 1904
Party	Candidate	Votes	%	±%
Liberal	D.L. Jones	unopposed		
Liberal hold		Swing		

=== Nantcwnlle ===
Dr Evan Evans, sitting member for Felinfach, switched to Nantcwnlle, allowing retiring alderman Walter Thomas Davies to contest Felinfach.

Nantcwnlle 1904
Party	Candidate	Votes	%	±%
Liberal	Dr Evan Evans*	169		
Unionist	Rev D Edwards	71		
Majority		68		
Liberal gain from Conservative		Swing		

=== New Quay ===
New Quay 1904
Party	Candidate	Votes	%	±%
Liberal	Evan James Davies*	unopposed		
Liberal hold		Swing		

=== Penbryn ===
Penbryn 1904
Party	Candidate	Votes	%	±%
Liberal	David Jones*	unopposed		
Liberal hold		Swing		

=== Strata Florida ===
Strata Florida 1904
Party	Candidate	Votes	%	±%
Liberal	Edward Evans*	unopposed		
Liberal hold		Swing		

=== Taliesin ===
Taliesin 1904
Party	Candidate	Votes	%	±%
Unionist	Dr James	134		
Liberal	David Williams*	79		
Majority		68		
Unionist gain from Liberal		Swing		

=== Talybont ===
Talybont 1904
Party	Candidate	Votes	%	±%
Liberal	Edward Jones*	unopposed		
Liberal hold		Swing		

=== Trefeurig ===
Trefeurig 1904
Party	Candidate	Votes	%	±%
Liberal	Peter Jones**	unopposed		
Liberal hold		Swing		

=== Tregaron ===
Tregaron 1904
Party	Candidate	Votes	%	±%
Liberal	Dr Evan Lloyd*	unopposed		
Liberal hold		Swing		

=== Troedyraur ===
Troedyraur 1901
Party	Candidate	Votes	%	±%
Liberal	Daniel Evans	unopposed		
Liberal hold		Swing		

=== Ysbyty Ystwyth ===
Ysbyty Ystwyth
Party	Candidate	Votes	%	±%
Liberal	Morgan Thomas	unopposed		
Liberal hold		Swing		

== Election of Aldermen ==
Once again a number of aldermen who had not faced the electorate were elected. Evan Richards was elected aldermen for a third term (although he had not faced the electorate since 1892) and Sir Marteine Lloyd and the Rev John Williams for a second term. The other five aldermen were new appointments, including Thomas Morris who had not contested the election. Peter Jones (an alderman since 1889 although he had always sought re-election) and J.M. Howell (an alderman since 1898) were two prominent figures who were re-elected as councillors but not as aldermen.

The following were elected:

- Sir Marteine Lloyd, Conservative. (retiring alderman, from outside Council - did not seek election)
- Edward Evans, Liberal (elected councillor for Strada Florida)
- Vaughan Davies, M.P., (elected councillor for Llanfarian)
- Thomas Morris. (from outside the Council, retiring member for Troedyraur)
- Lima Jones (elected councillor for Aberaeron)
- Evan Richards, (retiring alderman, from outside Council - did not seek election)
- Rev. John Williams (retiring alderman, from outside Council - did not seek election)
- Dr. Jenkyn Lewis.(elected councillor for Cilcennin)

== 1904 by-elections following the election of aldermen ==
At Cilcennin and Llanfarian Conservative candidates were elected unopposed to fill Liberal vacancies. While one local paper said it 'spoke well' of the Liberals to allow political opponents to take the two seats, including that previously held by the sitting Liberal MP, it also reflected the decline of partisan politics in the county since 1889.

=== Aberaeron by-election ===
Following Lima Jones's election as alderman, three candidates contested the by-election.

Aberaeron by-election 1904
Party	Candidate	Votes	%	±%
Liberal	Francis Evans	124		
Liberal	John Davies	98		
Conservative	D. Pennant James	48		
Majority		26		
Liberal hold		Swing		

=== Cilcennin by-election ===
Cilcennin by-election 1904
Party	Candidate	Votes	%	±%
Conservative	Price Lewes	unopposed		
Conservative gain from Liberal		Swing		

=== Llanfarian by-election ===
Llanfarian by-election 1904
Party	Candidate	Votes	%	±%
Conservative	Edward Powell	unopposed		
Conservative gain from Liberal		Swing		

=== Strata Florida by-election ===
Strata Florida by-election 1904
Party	Candidate	Votes	%	±%
Liberal	Thomas Jones	unopposed		
Liberal hold		Swing		
