= 1910 Cardiganshire County Council election =

1910 Welsh local election

The eighth election for Cardiganshire County Council took place in March 1910. They were preceded by the 1907 election and followed by the 1913 election

== Overview of the result ==
As in previous elections, there was a Liberal majority.

== Candidates ==
As in previous elections, there were a large number of unopposed returns. In all 31 members were returned without a contest.

== Gains and losses ==
Very few seats changed hands.

== Contested elections ==
It was stated that the bitterest fights were between candidates of the same political persuasion.

== Retiring aldermen ==
Eight aldermen retired. These included one Conservative, Sir Marteine Lloyd, and seven Liberals. Edward Evans, Lima Jones and Dr Jenkin Lewis sought re-election but were not subsequently re-appointed aldermen. Vaughan Davies MP, Evan Richards and Rev John Williams did not seek re-election but were re-appointed. Sir Marteine Lloyd and Thomas Morris retired from county politics

== The new council ==
Cardiganshire County Council 1910 : elected members
| Party | Seats | Gains | Losses | Net gain/loss | Seats % | Votes % | Votes | +/− |
|---|---|---|---|---|---|---|---|---|
| Liberal | | | | | | | | |
| Conservative | | | | | | | | |
| Liberal Unionist | | | | | | | | |
| Independent | | | | | | | | |

Cardiganshire County Council 1910 : elected members and sitting aldermen
| Party | Seats | Gains | Losses | Net gain/loss | Seats % | Votes % | Votes | +/− |
|---|---|---|---|---|---|---|---|---|
| Liberal | | | | | | | | |
| Conservative | | | | | | | | |
| Liberal Unionist | | | | | | | | |
| Independent | | | | | | | | |

Cardiganshire County Council 1910 : following election of new aldermen and by-elections
| Party | Seats | Gains | Losses | Net gain/loss | Seats % | Votes % | Votes | +/− |
|---|---|---|---|---|---|---|---|---|
| Liberal | | | | | | | | |
| Conservative | | | | | | | | |
| Liberal Unionist | | | | | | | | |
| Independent | | | | | | | | |

== Results ==
=== Aberaeron ===
Aberaeron 1910
| Party | Candidate | Votes | % | ±% |
|---|---|---|---|---|
| Liberal | E. Lima Jones** | 203 | | |
| Conservative | Henry Davies | 69 | | |
| Majority | | 134 | | |
| Liberal hold | | Swing | | |

=== Aberbanc ===
Aberbanc 1910
| Party | Candidate | Votes | % | ±% |
|---|---|---|---|---|
| Liberal | William Jeremy* | unopposed | | |
| Liberal hold | | Swing | | |

=== Aberporth ===
Joshua Hughes was elected unopposed having previously represented the ward in the 1890s.

Aberporth 1910
| Party | Candidate | Votes | % | ±% |
|---|---|---|---|---|
| Liberal | Joshua Hughes | unopposed | | |
| Liberal hold | | Swing | | |

=== Aberystwyth Division 1 ===
Aberystwyth Division 1 1910
| Party | Candidate | Votes | % | ±% |
|---|---|---|---|---|
| Liberal | Thomas Doughton | 191 | | |
| Conservative | J.T. Davies | 125 | | |
| Majority | | 66 | | |
| Liberal hold | | Swing | | |

=== Aberystwyth Division 2 ===
Aberystwyth Division 2 1910
| Party | Candidate | Votes | % | ±% |
|---|---|---|---|---|
| Liberal | D.C. Roberts* | 189 | | |
| Conservative | C.P. Lloyd | 129 | | |
| Majority | | 60 | | |
| Liberal hold | | Swing | | |

=== Aberystwyth Division 3 ===
Aberystwyth Division 3 1910
| Party | Candidate | Votes | % | ±% |
|---|---|---|---|---|
| Liberal | Robert Ellis* | 230 | | |
| Conservative | Randolph Fear | 156 | | |
| Majority | | 74 | | |
| Liberal hold | | Swing | | |

=== Aberystwyth Division 4 ===
Aberystwyth Division 4 1910
| Party | Candidate | Votes | % | ±% |
|---|---|---|---|---|
| Conservative | George Fossett Roberts* | 318 | | |
| Liberal | B. Taylor Lloyd | 196 | | |
| Majority | | 122 | | |
| Conservative hold | | Swing | | |

=== Aeron ===
Aeron 1910
| Party | Candidate | Votes | % | ±% |
|---|---|---|---|---|
| Liberal | John Morgan Howell* | Unopposed | N/A | N/A |
| Liberal hold | | | | |

=== Borth ===
Borth 1910
| Party | Candidate | Votes | % | ±% |
|---|---|---|---|---|
| Liberal | William Morris* | unopposed | | |
| Liberal hold | | Swing | | |

=== Bow Street ===
Bow Street 1910
| Party | Candidate | Votes | % | ±% |
|---|---|---|---|---|
| Conservative | Sir Edward Pryse* | unopposed | | |
| Conservative hold | | Swing | | |

=== Cardigan North ===
Cardigan North 1910
| Party | Candidate | Votes | % | ±% |
|---|---|---|---|---|
| Liberal | O. Beynon Evans* | unopposed | | |
| Liberal hold | | Swing | | |

=== Cardigan South ===
Cardigan South 1910
| Party | Candidate | Votes | % | ±% |
|---|---|---|---|---|
| Liberal | Dr J.W. Stephens* | unopposed | | |
| Liberal hold | | Swing | | |

=== Cilcennin ===
Cilcennin 1910
| Party | Candidate | Votes | % | ±% |
|---|---|---|---|---|
| Liberal | John Jones | unopposed | | |
| Liberal gain from Conservative | | Swing | | |

=== Cwmrheidol ===
Cwmrheidol 1910
| Party | Candidate | Votes | % | ±% |
|---|---|---|---|---|
| Liberal | Edward Jones | unopposed | | |
| Liberal hold | | Swing | | |

=== Devil's Bridge ===
Devil's Bridge 1910
| Party | Candidate | Votes | % | ±% |
|---|---|---|---|---|
| Liberal | Rev T. Mason Jones* | unopposed | | |
| Liberal hold | | Swing | | |

=== Felinfach ===
Llanfihangel Ystrad 1901
| Party | Candidate | Votes | % | ±% |
|---|---|---|---|---|
| Liberal | Walter Thomas Davies** | 135 | | |
| Liberal | John Jones | 98 | | |
| Unionist | D. Jones | 75 | | |
| Majority | | 23 | | |
| Liberal hold | | Swing | | |

=== Goginan ===
Goginan 1910
| Party | Candidate | Votes | % | ±% |
|---|---|---|---|---|
| Liberal | J. Pugh Lewis | unopposed | | |
| Liberal hold | | Swing | | |

=== Lampeter Borough ===
Lampeter Borough 1910
| Party | Candidate | Votes | % | ±% |
|---|---|---|---|---|
| Conservative | Rev Ll.J. Bebb* | unopposed | | |
| Conservative hold | | Swing | | |

=== Llanarth ===
Llanarth 1910
| Party | Candidate | Votes | % | ±% |
|---|---|---|---|---|
| Liberal | Morgan Evans* | unopposed | | |
| Liberal hold | | Swing | | |

=== Llanbadarn Fawr ===
Llanbadarn Fawr 1910
| Party | Candidate | Votes | % | ±% |
|---|---|---|---|---|
| Conservative | J.J. Bonsall* | 162 | | |
| Liberal | Edwin Lewis | 100 | | |
| Majority | | 62 | | |
| Conservative hold | | Swing | | |

=== Llanddewi Brefi ===
Llanddewi Brefi 1910
| Party | Candidate | Votes | % | ±% |
|---|---|---|---|---|
| Conservative | R.S. Rowland* | unopposed | | |
| Conservative hold | | Swing | | |

=== Llandygwydd ===
Llandygwydd 1910
| Party | Candidate | Votes | % | ±% |
|---|---|---|---|---|
| Liberal | Evan Williams | unopposed | | |
| Liberal hold | | Swing | | |

=== Llandysul North ===
Jenkin Jones appears to have stood as a Liberal in 1907.

Llandysul North 1910
| Party | Candidate | Votes | % | ±% |
|---|---|---|---|---|
| Liberal | Josiah Richard Jones | 151 | | |
| Conservative | Jenkin Jones* | 78 | | |
| Majority | | 78 | | |
| Liberal hold | | Swing | | |

=== Llandysul South ===
Llandysul South 1910
| Party | Candidate | Votes | % | ±% |
|---|---|---|---|---|
| Liberal | Rev T.A.. Thomas | 217 | | |
| Conservative | Charles Lloyd | 178 | | |
| Majority | | 39 | | |
| Liberal hold | | Swing | | |

=== Llansysiliogogo ===
Llansysiliogogo 1910
| Party | Candidate | Votes | % | ±% |
|---|---|---|---|---|
| Liberal | Jenkin Davies | unopposed | | |
| Liberal hold | | Swing | | |

=== Llanfair Clydogau ===
Llanfair Clydogau 1910
| Party | Candidate | Votes | % | ±% |
|---|---|---|---|---|
| Liberal | J.W. Davies | 140 | | |
| Conservative | Joseph Evans | 140 | | |
| Majority | | won on casting vote | | |
| Liberal gain from Conservative | | Swing | | |

=== Llanfarian ===
Llanfarian 1910
| Party | Candidate | Votes | % | ±% |
|---|---|---|---|---|
| Conservative | E.A.L. Powell* | unopposed | | |
| Conservative hold | | Swing | | |

=== Llanfihangel y Creuddyn ===
Llanfihangel y Creuddyn 1910
| Party | Candidate | Votes | % | ±% |
|---|---|---|---|---|
| Liberal | William Evans | unopposed | | |
| Liberal hold | | Swing | | |

=== Llangoedmor ===
Llangoedmor 1910
| Party | Candidate | Votes | % | ±% |
|---|---|---|---|---|
| Liberal | James Stephens* | unopposed | | |
| Liberal hold | | Swing | | |

=== Llangeitho ===
Llangeitho 1910
| Party | Candidate | Votes | % | ±% |
|---|---|---|---|---|
| Liberal | J.H. Davies* | unopposed | | |
| Liberal hold | | Swing | | |

=== Llangrannog ===
Llangrannog 1910
| Party | Candidate | Votes | % | ±% |
|---|---|---|---|---|
| Liberal | T. Jones | 83 | | |
| Liberal | Samuel Jones | 67 | | |
| Majority | | 16 | | |
| Liberal hold | | Swing | | |

=== Llanilar ===
Llanilar 1910
| Party | Candidate | Votes | % | ±% |
|---|---|---|---|---|
| Liberal | R.J.R. Loxdale* | unopposed | | |
| Liberal hold | | Swing | | |

=== Llanrhystyd ===
Llanrhystyd 1910
| Party | Candidate | Votes | % | ±% |
|---|---|---|---|---|
| Conservative | D. Morgan James* | 137 | | |
| Liberal | E.J. Evans | 125 | | |
| Majority | | 12 | | |
| Conservative hold | | Swing | | |

=== Llanllwchaiarn ===
Llanllwchaiarn 1910
| Party | Candidate | Votes | % | ±% |
|---|---|---|---|---|
| Liberal | Rev William Griffiths* | unopposed | | |
| Liberal hold | | Swing | | |

=== Llansantffraed ===
Retiring alderman Dr Jenkyn Lewis who had previously sat for Cilcennin won the seat. Liberal hold?

Llansantffraed 1910
| Party | Candidate | Votes | % | ±% |
|---|---|---|---|---|
| Liberal | Dr Jenkyn Lewis* | 156 | | |
| Conservative | J.L. Rowlands | 73 | | |
| Majority | | 83 | | |
| Liberal hold | | Swing | | |

=== Llanwnen ===
Llanwnen 1910
| Party | Candidate | Votes | % | ±% |
|---|---|---|---|---|
| Conservative | J.C. Harford* | unopposed | | |
| Conservative hold | | Swing | | |

=== Llanwenog ===
Llanwenog 1907
| Party | Candidate | Votes | % | ±% |
|---|---|---|---|---|
| Liberal | Herbert Davies-Evans jnr. | 163 | | |
| Liberal | D. Martin Jones* | 159 | | |
| Majority | | 4 | | |
| Conservative gain from Liberal | | Swing | | |

=== Lledrod ===
Lledrod 1910
| Party | Candidate | Votes | % | ±% |
|---|---|---|---|---|
| Liberal | Daniel L. Jones* | 154 | | |
| Liberal | Rev John Owen | 98 | | |
| Majority | | 56 | | |
| Liberal hold | | Swing | | |

=== Nantcwnlle ===
Nantcwnlle 1910
| Party | Candidate | Votes | % | ±% |
|---|---|---|---|---|
| Liberal | Lodwig Jones | unopposed | | |
| Liberal hold | | Swing | | |

=== New Quay ===
New Quay 1910
| Party | Candidate | Votes | % | ±% |
|---|---|---|---|---|
| Liberal | Evan James Davies* | unopposed | | |
| Liberal hold | | Swing | | |

=== Penbryn ===
Penbryn 1904
| Party | Candidate | Votes | % | ±% |
|---|---|---|---|---|
| Liberal | Griffith Davies* | unopposed | | |
| Liberal hold | | Swing | | |

=== Strata Florida ===
Strata Florida 1910
| Party | Candidate | Votes | % | ±% |
|---|---|---|---|---|
| Liberal | Edward Evans* | unopposed | | |
| Liberal hold | | Swing | | |

=== Taliesin ===
Taliesin 1910
| Party | Candidate | Votes | % | ±% |
|---|---|---|---|---|
| Liberal | Dr John James* | 152 | | |
| Conservative | Dr D.O. Williams | 50 | | |
| Majority | | 102 | | |
| Liberal hold | | Swing | | |

=== Talybont ===
Talybont 1910
| Party | Candidate | Votes | % | ±% |
|---|---|---|---|---|
| Liberal | Edward Evans* | unopposed | | |
| Liberal hold | | Swing | | |

=== Trefeurig ===
Trefeurig 1910
| Party | Candidate | Votes | % | ±% |
|---|---|---|---|---|
| Liberal | Peter Jones* | unopposed | | |
| Liberal hold | | Swing | | |

=== Tregaron ===
Tregaron 1910
| Party | Candidate | Votes | % | ±% |
|---|---|---|---|---|
| Liberal | D. J. Williams* | unopposed | | |
| Liberal hold | | Swing | | |

=== Troedyraur ===
Troedyraur 1910
| Party | Candidate | Votes | % | ±% |
|---|---|---|---|---|
| Liberal | Rev Daniel Evans* | unopposed | | |
| Liberal hold | | Swing | | |

=== Ysbyty Ystwyth ===
Ysbyty Ystwyth 1910
| Party | Candidate | Votes | % | ±% |
|---|---|---|---|---|
| Liberal | T. Morgan* | 90 | | |
| Conservative | J.G. Morris Davies | 59 | | |
| Majority | | 31 | | |
| Liberal hold | | Swing | | |

== Election of Aldermen ==
Eight aldermen were elected, including only one Conservative.

- M. L. Vaughan Davies, Liberal (retiring alderman, from outside Council - did not seek election)
- Evan Richards, Liberal (retiring alderman, from outside Council - did not seek election)
- R.J.R. Loxdale, Liberal (elected councillor at Llanilar)
- Major Price Lewes, Conservative (from outside the Council, retiring councillor at Cilcennin)
- Rev John Williams (retiring alderman, from outside Council - did not seek election)
- E.J. Davies, Liberal (elected councillor at New Quay)
- Rev Daniel Evans, Liberal (elected councillor at Troedyraur)
- D. Lewis Jones, Liberal (elected councillor at Lledrod)

== Aldermanic Vacancies 1910-1919 ==
The aldermen elected in 1910 served for nine years as there was no election in 1916 due to the First World War.

Alderman Morgan Evans died in 1915. Therefore, the following appointment was made

Alderman Evan Richards died in 1918. Therefore, the following appointment was made

- Rev John Owen, Liberal (elected councillor for Lledrod)

== 1910 by-elections following the election of aldermen ==
=== Llanilar by-election ===
E.J. Evans, Cwncybarcud, who previously represented Llanrhystud from 1901 until 1904 was returned unopposed following the appointment of R.J.R. Loxdale as alderman.

Llanilar by-election 1910
| Party | Candidate | Votes | % | ±% |
|---|---|---|---|---|
| Liberal | E.J. Evans | unopposed | | |
| Liberal hold | | Swing | | |

=== Lledrod by-election ===
A Liberal candidate was returned unopposed for Lledrod following the appointment of Daniel L. Jones as alderman.

Lledrod by-election 1910
| Party | Candidate | Votes | % | ±% |
|---|---|---|---|---|
| Liberal | Rev T.R. Morgan | unopposed | | |
| Liberal hold | | Swing | | |

=== New Quay by-election ===
Following the appointment of E.J. Davies as alderman no valid nomination was initially received.

New Quay by-election 1910
| Party | Candidate | Votes | % | ±% |
|---|---|---|---|---|
| Liberal | Evan James Davies* | unopposed | | |
| Liberal hold | | Swing | | |

=== Troedyraur by-election ===
Troedyraur by-election 1910
| Party | Candidate | Votes | % | ±% |
|---|---|---|---|---|
| Liberal | Rev Daniel Evans* | unopposed | | |
| Liberal hold | | Swing | | |
