= 1895 Cardiganshire County Council election =

1895 Welsh local election

The third election to the Cardiganshire County Council took place in March 1895. It was preceded by the 1892 election and followed by the 1898 election

== Overview of the result ==
The Liberals were again returned with a large majority. There were a large number of unopposed returns.

== Retiring Aldermen ==
The following aldermen, all of whom were Liberals, retired at the election.

- C.M. Williams
- David Jenkins, Maesteg, Glandovey
- Levi James
- William Davies
- J.T. Morgan
- David Lloyd
- John Davies
- Rev John Owen

Only C.M. Williams in Aberystwyth and David Lloyd in Aberbanc sought election. Levi James (Cardigan), William Davies (New Quay), J.T. Morgan (Talybont) and David Jenkins, Glandovey (elected from outside the Council) all stood down and did not seek re-election. John Davies, Tanycoed and John Owen, Blaenpennal, who had filled aldermanic vacancies since 1889 did likewise. All those who stood down retired from county politics apart from J.T. Morgan who was re-elected as an alderman despite not facing the electorate.

== Contested Elections ==
There were fewer contested elections than on the previous two occasions as the politics of the county seems to settle down after the initial contests. In Aberystwyth it was said that the Town Council elections the previous November had elicited much greater interest.

Those seats that were contested witnessed a swing towards the Conservative candidates, who captured a total of seven seats. These included significant victories at Cardigan and Llandysul. The contest in Bow Street could also be regarded as a Conservative gain.

It was said that a plough belonging to a farmer in Borth was destroyed due to his support for the Conservative candidate.

== The New Council ==
The Liberals once again had a comfortable majority. Morgan Evans of Llanarth was elected chairman for 1895/96.

=== Elected members ===
Cardiganshire County Council 1895 : elected members
Party	Seats	Gains	Losses	Net gain/loss	Seats %	Votes %	Votes	+/−
Liberal	35	2	8	-6				
Conservative	12	7	1	+6				
Liberal Unionist	0	0	1	-1				
Ind. Conservative	1	1	0	+1				
Independent	0	0	0	0				

=== Council following the election of aldermen and by-elections ===
Cardiganshire County Council 1895 : following the election of aldermen
Party	Seats	Gains	Losses	Net gain/loss	Seats %	Votes %	Votes	+/−
Liberal	44							
Conservative	14							
Liberal Unionist	1							
Ind. Conservative	1							
Independent								

Cardiganshire County Council 1895 : following by-elections
Party	Seats	Gains	Losses	Net gain/loss	Seats %	Votes %	Votes	+/−
Liberal	48	0	0	0				
Conservative	14	0	0	0				
Liberal Unionist	1	0	0	0				
Ind. Conservative	1	0	0	0				
Independent								

== Division results ==
=== Aberaeron ===
Aberaeron 1895
Party	Candidate	Votes	%	±%
Liberal	John Morgan Howell*	unopposed		
Liberal hold		Swing		

=== Aberarth ===
Two Liberals faced each other although the sitting member was described as a Conservative in some quarters.

Aberarth 1895
Party	Candidate	Votes	%	±%
Liberal	Evan Lima Jones	147		
Liberal	John Timothy Evans*	72		
Majority		75		
Liberal hold		Swing		

=== Aberbanc ===
Dr David Lloyd, whose aldermanic term had come to an end, was elected unopposed in place of Evan Davies.

Aberbanc 1895
Party	Candidate	Votes	%	±%
Liberal	David Lloyd**	unopposed		
Liberal hold		Swing		

=== Aberporth ===
Aberporth 1895
Party	Candidate	Votes	%	±%
Liberal	Joshua Hughes*	unopposed		
Liberal hold		Swing		

=== Aberystwyth Division 1 ===
Aberystwyth Division 1 1895
Party	Candidate	Votes	%	±%
Unionist	William Hughes Jones	148		
Liberal	J.P. Thomas	116		
Majority		32		
Unionist gain from Liberal		Swing		

=== Aberystwyth Division 2 ===
The sitting member was returned unopposed after E.V. Wynne, chemist, withdrew.

Aberystwyth Division 2 1895
Party	Candidate	Votes	%	±%
Liberal	D.C. Roberts*	unopposed		
Liberal hold		Swing		

=== Aberystwyth Division 3 ===
Aberystwyth Division 3 1895
Party	Candidate	Votes	%	±%
Liberal	Robert Ellis	148		
Conservative	Dr T.P. Beddoes	141		
Majority		7		
Liberal hold		Swing		

=== Aberystwyth Division 4 ===
Aberystwyth Division 4 1895
Party	Candidate	Votes	%	±%
Liberal	C.M. Williams**	165		
Conservative	Capt. Thomas Doughton	90		
Majority		75		
Liberal hold		Swing		

=== Borth ===
Borth 1895
Party	Candidate	Votes	%	±%
Conservative	John Morgan Williams	188		
Liberal	Capt. John Francis	84		
Majority		104		
Conservative gain from Liberal		Swing		

=== Bow Street ===
Bow Street 1895
Party	Candidate	Votes	%	±%
Ind. Conservative	Henry Bonsall	75		
Conservative	Richard Thomas	74		
Majority		1		
Ind. Conservative gain from Liberal		Swing		

=== Cardigan North ===
Cardigan North 1895
Party	Candidate	Votes	%	±%
Liberal	Rev John Williams*	unopposed		
Liberal hold		Swing		

=== Cardigan South ===
Cardigan South 1895
Party	Candidate	Votes	%	±%
Conservative	C.E.D. Morgan-Richardson	200		
Liberal	James Stephens*	126		
Majority		74		
Conservative gain from Liberal		Swing		

=== Cilcennin ===
Cilcennin 1895
Party	Candidate	Votes	%	±%
Liberal	John Jones*	136		
Conservative	Evan Felix	95		
Majority		41		
Liberal hold		Swing		

=== Cwmrheidol ===
Nicholas Bray regained the seat he lost in 1892 after winning the initial election in 1889.

Cwmrheidol 1895
Party	Candidate	Votes	%	±%
Conservative	Capt. Nicholas Bray	72		
Liberal	John Morgan	65		
Majority		7		
Conservative gain from Liberal		Swing		

=== Devil's Bridge ===
Devil's Bridge
Party	Candidate	Votes	%	±%
Liberal	David Jones	unopposed		
Liberal hold		Swing		

=== Felinfach ===
This ward was now commonly described as Felinfach rather than Llanfihangel Ystrad.

Felinfach 1895
Party	Candidate	Votes	%	±%
Liberal	Walter Thomas Davies*			
Liberal hold		Swing		

=== Goginan ===
Goginan 1895
Party	Candidate	Votes	%	±%
Liberal	Joseph Parry	unopposed		
Liberal hold		Swing		

=== Lampeter Borough ===
Harford, elected in a close contest in 1889, did not initially seek re-election in 1892, but was returned unopposed after David Lloyd was made an alderman.

Lampeter Borough 1895
Party	Candidate	Votes	%	±%
Conservative	John Charles Harford	unopposed		
Conservative hold		Swing		

=== Llanarth ===
Llanarth 1895
Party	Candidate	Votes	%	±%
Liberal	Morgan Evans*	unopposed		
Liberal hold		Swing		

=== Llanbadarn Fawr ===
Llanbadarn Fawr 1895
Party	Candidate	Votes	%	±%
Conservative	Hugh Hughes*	unopposed		
Conservative hold		Swing		

=== Llanddewi Brefi ===
David Davies had lost his seat at the previous election in 1892 and narrowly lost the by-election following the successful candidate's election as alderman.

Llanddewi Brefi 1895
Party	Candidate	Votes	%	±%
Liberal	David Davies	139		
Conservative	Rees Price	99		
Majority		40		
Liberal gain from Liberal Unionist		Swing		

=== Llandygwydd ===
Llandygwydd 1895
Party	Candidate	Votes	%	±%
Conservative	Col. John Richard Howell*	unopposed		
Conservative hold		Swing		

=== Llandysiliogogo ===
Llansysiliogogo 1895
Party	Candidate	Votes	%	±%
Liberal	Evan Evans*	unopposed		
Liberal hold		Swing		

=== Llandysul North ===
Llandysul North 1895
Party	Candidate	Votes	%	±%
Liberal	William Jones	80		
Liberal	Daniel Evans	47		
Majority		33		

=== Llandysul South ===
The sitting member, Enoch Davies, was returned for the neighbouring Penbryn Ward, leading to the loss of this ward to the Conservatives.

Llandysul South 1895
Party	Candidate	Votes	%	±%
Conservative	Charles Lloyd	198		
Liberal	Benjamin Jones	176		
Majority		22		
Conservative gain from Liberal		Swing		

=== Llanfair Clydogau ===
The sitting member held on against the most prominent Liberal Unionist in Cardiganshire.

Llanfair Clydogau 1895
Party	Candidate	Votes	%	±%
Liberal	John Watkin Davies*	129		
Liberal Unionist	Henry Tobit Evans	124		
Majority		5		
Liberal hold		Swing		

=== Llanfarian ===
Llanfarian 1895
Party	Candidate	Votes	%	±%
Liberal	Vaughan Davies*	unopposed		
Liberal hold		Swing		

=== Llanfihangel y Creuddyn ===
Llanfihangel y Creuddyn 1895
Party	Candidate	Votes	%	±%
Liberal	William Evans*	unopposed		
Liberal hold		Swing		

=== Llangoedmor ===
Llangoedmor 1895
Party	Candidate	Votes	%	±%
Liberal	David Samuel Jones*	unopposed		
Liberal hold		Swing		

=== Llangeitho ===
Robert J. Davies of Cwrt Mawr had died shortly after the 1892 election.

Llangeitho 1895
Party	Candidate	Votes	%	±%
Liberal	John Rowlands	142		
Liberal	John Humphreys Davies	130		
Majority		12		
Liberal gain from Unionist		Swing		

=== Llangrannog ===
Llangrannog
Party	Candidate	Votes	%	±%
Liberal	Thomas Evans	unopposed		
Liberal hold		Swing		

=== Llanilar ===
Llanilar 1895
Party	Candidate	Votes	%	±%
Liberal	Benjamin Jones*	unopposed		
Liberal hold		Swing		

=== Llanrhystyd ===
Llanrhystyd 1895
Party	Candidate	Votes	%	±%
Conservative	Evan Jones	unopposed		
Conservative gain from Liberal		Swing		

=== Llanllwchaiarn ===
Llanllwchaiarn 1895
Party	Candidate	Votes	%	±%
Liberal	Rev William Griffiths	86		
Liberal	Enoch Thomas	65		
Majority		21		
Liberal hold		Swing		

=== Llansantffraed ===
Llansantffraed 1895
Party	Candidate	Votes	%	±%
Conservative	Evan Morgan	113		
Liberal	Capt. Daniel Jones*	95		
Majority		18		
Conservative gain from Liberal		Swing		

=== Llanwnen ===
Llanwnen
Party	Candidate	Votes	%	±%
Liberal	Thomas Hugh Rice Hughes*	unopposed		
Liberal hold		Swing		

=== Llanwenog ===
Llanwenog 1895
Party	Candidate	Votes	%	±%
Liberal	David Bowen Jones	149		
Conservative	Thomas Jones	115		
Majority		34		
Liberal hold		Swing		

=== Lledrod ===
Lledrod
Party	Candidate	Votes	%	±%
Liberal	David Jenkins	unopposed		
Liberal hold		Swing		

=== Nantcwnlle ===
Having captured the seat in 1892, Jenkin Howells held on by a mere three votes over David Jones of Station Road, Lampeter.

Nantcwnlle 1895
Party	Candidate	Votes	%	±%
Conservative	Jenkin Howells	121		
Liberal	David Jones	118		
Majority		3		
Conservative hold		Swing		

=== New Quay ===
New Quay 1895
Party	Candidate	Votes	%	±%
Conservative	Sir Marteine Lloyd*	unopposed		
Conservative hold		Swing		

=== Penbryn ===
Penbryn 1895
Party	Candidate	Votes	%	±%
Liberal	Enoch Davies	unopposed		
Liberal hold		Swing		

=== Strata Florida ===
Strata Florida 1895
Party	Candidate	Votes	%	±%
Liberal	John Richards	unopposed		
Liberal gain from Conservative		Swing		

=== Taliesin ===
John Jones, elected unopposed in 1892, was returned by a small majority over another Liberal

Taliesin 1895
Party	Candidate	Votes	%	±%
Liberal	John Jones*	94		
Liberal	Richard Jenkins	86		
Liberal hold		Swing		

=== Talybont ===
Talybont 1895
Party	Candidate	Votes	%	±%
Liberal	Edward Jones*	unopposed		
Liberal hold		Swing		

=== Trefeurig ===
This was the first time Llewelyn Edwards had won a contested election, having been defeated at Llanbadarn Fawr in 1889 and 1892. On the former occasion he was made an alderman despite his defeat and on the latter elected unopposed for Trefeurig following Peter Jones's elevation to the aldermanic bench.

Trefeurig 1895
Party	Candidate	Votes	%	±%
Liberal	Llewelyn Edwards*	63		
Conservative	Henry William Francis	47		
Liberal hold		Swing		

=== Tregaron ===
D.J. Williams had previously represented Tregaron as a Liberal Unionist from a by-election in 1889 until 1892 when he did not stand. He was elected for Llanddewi Brefi at a by-election in 1892

Tregaron 1895
Party	Candidate	Votes	%	±%
Liberal	Daniel Jenkin Williams*	195		
Conservative	William Rees	82		
Liberal hold		Swing		

=== Troedyraur ===
Troedyraur 1895
Party	Candidate	Votes	%	±%
Liberal	Thomas Morris*	unopposed		
Liberal hold		Swing		

=== Ysbyty Ystwyth ===
Ysbyty Ystwyth 1895
Party	Candidate	Votes	%	±%
Liberal	Rev T.M. Jones	unopposed		
Liberal hold		Swing		

== Election of Aldermen ==
The overhaul of the aldermanic bench saw the election of key figures from the liberal ranks. Having avoided the principle of electing from outside the Council four years previously this practice was now adopted once again, leading to criticism, most notably from the Liberal-supporting Cambrian News. It was noted in particular that three defeated candidates were elected, namely James Stevens at Cardigan, Daniel Jones of Llanon and Davies of Cwrtmawr. J.T. Morgan of Talybont was also re-elected although he had not contested the election.

- T. H. R. Hughes, Liberal (elected councillor at Llanwnen)
- C. M. Williams, Liberal (retiring alderman; elected councillor at Aberystywth Ward 4)
- Morgan Evans, Liberal (elected councillor at Llanarth)
- James Stephens, Liberal (defeated candidate at Cardigan South)
- John Humphreys Davies, Liberal (defeated candidate at Llangeitho)
- Enoch Davies, Liberal (elected councillor at Penbryn )
- J.T. Morgan, Liberal (retiring alderman, from outside Council - did not seek election)
- Daniel Jones, Liberal (defeated candidate at Llansanffraed )

== Aldermanic Vacancies 1895-1901 ==
Daniel Jones died a few months after the election. In August 1895, James James of Ffynonhowell, from outside of the Council, was appointed to succeed him.

Therefore, the following appointment was made for the remainder of the six-year term.

- James Jones, Liberal (from outside the Council)

== 1895 by-elections following the election of aldermen ==
=== Aberystwyth Division 4 by-election ===
The Liberals comfortably retained the seat although the Aberystwyth Observer complained that the Conservatives 'made no special effort' to support their candidate.

Aberystwyth Division 4 by-election 1895
Party	Candidate	Votes	%	±%
Liberal	E.H. James	181		
Conservative	Thomas Salmon	97		
Majority		84		
Liberal hold		Swing		

=== Llanarth by-election ===
Following the appointment of Morgan Evans as alderman, James Evans of Esgerwenfawr was selected as a candidate by the local Liberals, and was returned unopposed.

Llanarth by-election 1895
Party	Candidate	Votes	%	±%
Liberal	James Evans	unopposed		
Liberal hold		Swing		

=== Llanwnen by-election ===
The Liberals narrowly held the seat following the election of T.H.R. Hughes as alderman.

Llanwnen by-election 1895
Party	Candidate	Votes	%	±%
Liberal	Edward Owen Jones	104		
Conservative	Joseph Price	91		
Majority		13		
Liberal hold		Swing		

=== Penbryn by-election ===
Following the appointment of Dr Enoch Davies as alderman, the previous member, Peter R. Beynon won the by-election.

Penbryn by-election 1895
Party	Candidate	Votes	%	±%
Liberal	Peter R. Beynon	121		
Liberal	D. Griffiths	96		
Majority		25		
Liberal hold		Swing		
