= 1907 Cardiganshire County Council election =

1907 Welsh local election

The seventh election for Cardiganshire County Council took place in March 1907. They were preceded by the 1904 election and followed by the 1910 election

== Overview of the result ==
As in previous elections, there was a Liberal majority, with 36 of the elected members being Liberals and 12 Conservatives.

== Unopposed Returns ==
There were a large number of unopposed returns.

== Gains and Losses ==
The Liberals gained two seats, one at Aberystwyth where Captain Thomas Doughton regained the seat in No.1 Ward which he had previously held between and the other at Llanllwchaiarn where sitting alderman Rev William Griffiths ousted the siting councillor Evan Lewis by four votes. In turn, however, they lost three seats. At Llanrhystud the previous Conservative member regained the seat he lost three years before while two major landowners won significant victories. The Lord Lieutenant, Herbert Davies-Evans won at Llanddewi Brefi while J.C. Harford of Falcondale narrowly captured Llanwnen.

== Contested Elections ==
contested elections were mostly won by Liberals.

== Retiring Aldermen ==
Eight aldermen retired, all of whom were Liberals apart from Sir Marteine Lloyd. Peter Jones, J.M. Howell, Walter T. Davies and the Rev T. Mason Jones stood in the election but were not re-elected aldermen. Sir Marteine Lloyd, Evan Richards and Rev John Williams were re-elected without facing the electorate. John Powell stood down.

== The New Council ==
Cardiganshire County Council 1907 : elected members
Party	Seats	Gains	Losses	Net gain/loss	Seats %	Votes %	Votes	+/−
Liberal								
Conservative								
Liberal Unionist								
Independent								

Cardiganshire County Council 1907 : elected members and sitting aldermen
Party	Seats	Gains	Losses	Net gain/loss	Seats %	Votes %	Votes	+/−
Liberal								
Conservative								
Liberal Unionist								
Independent								

Cardiganshire County Council 1907 : following election of new aldermen and by-elections
Party	Seats	Gains	Losses	Net gain/loss	Seats %	Votes %	Votes	+/−
Liberal								
Conservative								
Liberal Unionist								
Independent								

== Results ==
=== Aberaeron ===
Aberaeron 1907
Party	Candidate	Votes	%	±%
Liberal	John Davies Davies	160		
Liberal	Francis Evans*	105		
Majority		55		
Liberal hold		Swing		

=== Aberbanc ===
Aberbanc 1907
Party	Candidate	Votes	%	±%
Liberal	Evan Davies*	unopposed		
Liberal hold		Swing		

=== Aberporth ===
Aberporth 1907
Party	Candidate	Votes	%	±%
Liberal	Thomas Watkins*	85		
Liberal	Joshua Hughes	80		
Majority		5		
Liberal hold		Swing		

=== Aberystwyth Division 1 ===
Aberystwyth Division 1 1907
Party	Candidate	Votes	%	±%
Liberal	Thomas Doughton	173		
Unionist	R.J. Jones*	142		
Majority		31		
Liberal gain from Unionist		Swing		

=== Aberystwyth Division 2 ===
Aberystwyth Division 2 1907
Party	Candidate	Votes	%	±%
Liberal	D.C. Roberts*	unopposed		
Liberal hold		Swing		

=== Aberystwyth Division 3 ===
Aberystwyth Division 3 1907
Party	Candidate	Votes	%	±%
Liberal	Robert Ellis*	215		
Conservative	J.T, Davies	164		
Majority		51		
Liberal hold		Swing		

=== Aberystwyth Division 4 ===
Fossett Roberts retained the seat he won at a by-election in 1905, in a contest dominated by accusations about nonconformist ministers' involvement.

Aberystwyth Division 4 1907
Party	Candidate	Votes	%	±%
Conservative	George Fossett Roberts*	267		
Liberal	Edwin Morris	192		
Majority		75		
Conservative hold		Swing		

=== Aeron ===
Aeron 1907
Party	Candidate	Votes	%	±%
Liberal	John Morgan Howell*	Unopposed	N/A	N/A
Liberal hold				

=== Borth ===
Borth 1907
Party	Candidate	Votes	%	±%
Liberal	Richard James*	unopposed		
Liberal hold		Swing		

=== Bow Street ===
Bow Street 1907
Party	Candidate	Votes	%	±%
Liberal	A.P. Howell	unopposed		
Liberal hold		Swing		

=== Cardigan North ===
Cardigan North 1907
Party	Candidate	Votes	%	±%
Liberal	O. Beynon Evans*	unopposed		
Liberal hold		Swing		

=== Cardigan South ===
Cardigan South 1907
Party	Candidate	Votes	%	±%
Liberal	Dr James William Stephens*	unopposed		
Liberal hold		Swing		

=== Cilcennin ===
Cilcennin 1907
Party	Candidate	Votes	%	±%
Conservative	Major Price Lewes	166		
Liberal	John Edwards	76		
Liberal hold		Swing		

=== Cwmrheidol ===
Cwmrheidol 1907
Party	Candidate	Votes	%	±%
Liberal	William Evans*	unopposed		
Liberal hold		Swing		

=== Devil's Bridge ===
Devil's Bridge 1907
Party	Candidate	Votes	%	±%
Liberal	Rev T. Mason Jones**	unopposed		
Liberal hold		Swing		

=== Felinfach ===
Llanfihangel Ystrad 1907
Party	Candidate	Votes	%	±%
Liberal	Walter Thomas Davies**	135		
Liberal hold		Swing		

=== Goginan ===
Goginan 1907
Party	Candidate	Votes	%	±%
Liberal	Joseph Parry*	unopposed		
Liberal hold		Swing		

=== Lampeter Borough ===
Lampeter Borough 1907
Party	Candidate	Votes	%	±%
Conservative	Rev Llewellyn John Bebb	unopposed		
Conservative hold		Swing		

=== Llanarth ===
Llanarth 1907
Party	Candidate	Votes	%	±%
Liberal	Morgan Evans*	unopposed		
Liberal hold		Swing		

=== Llanbadarn Fawr ===
Llanbadarn Fawr 1907
Party	Candidate	Votes	%	±%
Conservative	J.J. Bonsall*	unopposed		
Conservative hold		Swing		

=== Llanddewi Brefi ===
Llanddewi Brefi 1907
Party	Candidate	Votes	%	±%
Conservative	R.S. Rowland*	unopposed		
Conservative hold		Swing		

=== Llandygwydd ===
Llandygwydd 1907
Party	Candidate	Votes	%	±%
Conservative	Sir Edward Webley-Parry-Pryse	unopposed		
Conservative hold		Swing		

=== Llandysul North ===
Llandysul North 1907
Party	Candidate	Votes	%	±%
Liberal	Jenkin Jones*	119		
Liberal	William Davies*	105		
Liberal hold		Swing		

=== Llandysul South ===
Llandysul South 1907
Party	Candidate	Votes	%	±%
Liberal	Rev Thomas Arthur Thomas**	203		
Conservative	Charles Lloyd	191		
Liberal hold		Swing		

=== Llansysiliogogo ===
Llansysiliogogo 1907
Party	Candidate	Votes	%	±%
Conservative	Tom Parry*	unopposed		
Conservative hold		Swing		

=== Llanfair Clydogau ===
Llanfair Clydogau 1907
Party	Candidate	Votes	%	±%
Unionist	Colonel H. Davies-Evans	165		
Liberal	D. Saunders Davies*	113		
Majority		52		
Conservative gain from Liberal		Swing		

=== Llanfarian ===
Llanfarian 1907
Party	Candidate	Votes	%	±%
Conservative	E.A.L. Powell*	unopposed		
Conservative hold		Swing		

=== Llanfihangel y Creuddyn ===
Llanfihangel y Creuddyn 1907
Party	Candidate	Votes	%	±%
Liberal	William Evans	unopposed		
Liberal hold		Swing		

=== Llangoedmor ===
Llangoedmor 1907
Party	Candidate	Votes	%	±%
Liberal	James Stephens	145		
Independent	B.T. Davies	78		
Majority		67		
Liberal hold		Swing		

=== Llangeitho ===
Llangeitho 1907
Party	Candidate	Votes	%	±%
Liberal	John Humphreys Davies	Unopposed	N/A	N/A
Liberal hold				

=== Llangrannog ===
Llangrannog 1907
Party	Candidate	Votes	%	±%
Liberal	Thomas Evans*	unopposed		
Liberal hold		Swing		

=== Llanilar ===
Llanilar 1907
Party	Candidate	Votes	%	±%
Liberal	Benjamin Jones*	unopposed		
Liberal hold		Swing		

=== Llanrhystyd ===
The result reversed the outcome four years previously.

Llanrhystyd 1907
Party	Candidate	Votes	%	±%
Conservative	D. Morgan James	155		
Liberal	E.J. Evans*	115		
Conservative gain from Liberal		Swing		

=== Llanllwchaiarn ===
Llanllwchaiarn 1907
Party	Candidate	Votes	%	±%
Liberal	Rev William Griffiths**	83		
Conservative	Evan Lewis*	79		
Majority		4		
Liberal gain from Conservative		Swing		

=== Llansantffraed ===
Llansantffraed 1907
Party	Candidate	Votes	%	±%
Liberal	Rev William Richards	unopposed		
Liberal hold		Swing		

=== Llanwnen ===
Llanwnen 1907
Party	Candidate	Votes	%	±%
Conservative	J.C. Harford**	90		
Liberal	David Evans*	88		
Liberal hold		Swing		

=== Llanwenog ===
Llanwenog 1907
Party	Candidate	Votes	%	±%
Liberal	D. Martin Jones*	178		
Liberal	Herbert Davies-Evans jnr.	147		
Liberal hold		Swing		

=== Lledrod ===
Lledrod 1907
Party	Candidate	Votes	%	±%
Liberal	Daniel L. Jones*	unopposed		
Liberal hold		Swing		

=== Nantcwnlle ===
Nantcwnlle 1907
Party	Candidate	Votes	%	±%
Liberal	W. Jenkin Lloyd	140		
Conservative	Evan Rees Lloyd	69		
Independent	Evan Davies	15		
Majority		71		
Liberal gain from Conservative		Swing		

=== New Quay ===
New Quay 1907
Party	Candidate	Votes	%	±%
Liberal	Evan James Davies*	139		
Liberal	Capt. Jenkin Thomas	127		
Independent	Evan Lewis	8		
Majority		12		
Liberal hold		Swing		

=== Penbryn ===
Penbryn 1907
Party	Candidate	Votes	%	±%
Liberal	Griffith Davies	unopposed		
Liberal hold		Swing		

=== Strata Florida ===
Strata Florida 1907
Party	Candidate	Votes	%	±%
Liberal	Rev R. Gwmryn Jones	unopposed		
Liberal hold		Swing		

=== Taliesin ===
Taliesin 1907
Party	Candidate	Votes	%	±%
Liberal	Dr John James*	130		
Conservative	Dr D.O. Williams	65		
Majority		65		
Unionist gain from Liberal		Swing		

=== Talybont ===
Talybont 1907
Party	Candidate	Votes	%	±%
Liberal	Edward Evans	unopposed		
Liberal	J. Bunce Morgan	unopposed		
Liberal hold		Swing		

=== Trefeurig ===
Trefeurig 1907
Party	Candidate	Votes	%	±%
Liberal	Peter Jones*	unopposed		
Liberal hold		Swing		

=== Tregaron ===
Tregaron 1907
Party	Candidate	Votes	%	±%
Liberal	D.J. Williams**	unopposed		
Liberal hold		Swing		

=== Troedyraur ===
Troedyraur 1907
Party	Candidate	Votes	%	±%
Liberal	Rev Daniel Evans*	unopposed		
Liberal hold		Swing		

=== Ysbyty Ystwyth ===
Ysbyty Ystwyth 1907
Party	Candidate	Votes	%	±%
Liberal	Thomas Morgan*	unopposed		
Liberal hold		Swing		

== Election of Aldermen ==
Five aldermen who had not faced the election were re-appointed, together with David Evans, who had lost by two votes at Llanwnen to J.C. Harford, another retiring alderman. (Note: By this time, it appears that the practice of deciding upon the list of candidates for the aldermanic bench in advance of the election had become well-established.)

- E J. Price, Conservative (retiring councillor at Llansantffraed - did not seek re-election)
- Col. J.R. Howell, Conservative (retiring alderman, from outside Council - did not seek election)
- Dr David Lloyd, Liberal (retiring alderman, from outside Council - did not seek election)
- D. Evans, Liberal (defeated candidate at Llanwnen)
- W.J. Lloyd, Liberal (elected councillor at Nantcwnlle)
- James James, Liberal (retiring alderman, from outside Council - did not seek election)
- C. M. Williams, Liberal (retiring alderman, from outside Council - did not seek election)
- J.T. Morgan, Liberal (retiring alderman, from outside Council - did not seek election)

== 1907 by-election following the election of aldermen ==
=== Nantcwnlle by-election ===
Following the election of W. Jenkin Lloyd as alderman, a Liberal candidate retained the seat.

Nantcwnlle by-election 1907
Party	Candidate	Votes	%	±%
Liberal	Hugh Herbert	138		
Conservative	Daniel Watkins	118		
Majority		20		
Liberal hold		Swing		
