= 1892 Cardiganshire County Council election =

1892 Welsh local election

All 64 seats to Cardiganshire County Council 33 seats needed for a majority
	First party	Second party	Third party
Party	Liberal	Conservative	Liberal Unionist
Last election	50/64	13/64
Seats before	50/64	13/64
Seats won	52/64	10/64	2/64
Councillors	39	7	2
Aldermen	13	3	0
	Fourth party
Party	Independent
Seats won	0/64
Councillors	0
Aldermen	0
Council control after election
Liberal
Liberal Party

The second election for the Cardiganshire County Council took place in March 1892. It was preceded by the inaugural 1889 election and followed by the 1895 election.

== Overview of the result ==
To some extent the euphoria of 1889 had passed three years later and the whole atmosphere was marked by less excitement. The result, however, was virtually identical to that of the inaugural election.

== Boundary changes ==
One feature was that the multi-member seats, which existed in urban areas in the first elections, were divided so that all councillors were now elected to represent single member wards.

== Candidates ==
There were far more unopposed returns than three years previously.

Of the eight retiring aldermen, only Jenkin Jenkins and Llewellyn Edwards, both of whom were made aldermen as defeated candidates in 1889, sought election.

== Outcome ==
The Liberals retained a substantial majority on the council.

Most contests were again on party lines although there were several instances of Liberals opposing each other. The Conservatives had a few successes, notably at New Quay where Captain Longcroft of Llanina triumphed following divisions amongst local nonconformists.

The two retiring aldermen who sought election had mixed fortunes. Jenkins won at Llanfihangel Ystrad but Edwards was again defeated at Llanbadarn, this time by solicitor Hugh Hughes.

In contrast to the initial elections, all eight aldermen selected in 1892 were elected members of the Council. The Conservatives were again allocated three places, although two of those selected had captured their seats from the Liberals at the recent election. Their elevation allowed the defeated Liberal candidates to be returned unopposed at the ensuing by-elections (see below).

== Ward results ==
=== Aberaeron ===
-->

Aberaeron 1892
Party	Candidate	Votes	%	±%
Liberal	John Morgan Howell*	145		
Liberal	David Evans	114		
Majority		34		
Liberal hold		Swing		

=== Aberarth ===
-->

Aberarth 1892
Party	Candidate	Votes	%	±%
Liberal	John Timothy Evans	125		
Liberal	D. Lewis	74		
Majority		51		
Liberal hold		Swing		

=== Aberbanc ===
-->

Aberbanc
Party	Candidate	Votes	%	±%
Liberal	Evan Davies*	unopposed		
Liberal hold		Swing		

=== Aberporth ===
The ward was known as Blaenporth at the previous election but there was no boundary change.

Aberporth 1892
Party	Candidate	Votes	%	±%
Liberal	T. Thomas*	unopposed		

=== Aberystwyth Division 1 ===
-->

Aberystwyth Division 1892
Party	Candidate	Votes	%	±%
Liberal	George Green*	unopposed		
Liberal hold		Swing		

=== Aberystwyth Division 2 ===
-->

Aberystwyth Division 2 1892
Party	Candidate	Votes	%	±%
Liberal	D.C. Roberts*	unopposed		
Liberal hold		Swing		

=== Aberystwyth Division 3 ===
-->

Aberystwyth Division 3 1892
Party	Candidate	Votes	%	±%
Liberal	John James*	141		
Conservative	W.H. Wemyss	129		
Majority		12		
Liberal hold		Swing		

=== Aberystwyth Division 4 ===
-->

Aberystwyth Division 4 1892
Party	Candidate	Votes	%	±%
Liberal	Rev Thomas Levi*	Unopposed	N/A	N/A
Liberal hold				

- There were boundary changes at Aberystwyth as the previous four-member ward was divided into four single-member wards. Liberal candidates held all seats in 1889 and 1892.

=== Borth ===
-->

Borth 1892
Party	Candidate	Votes	%	±%
Liberal	Rev Enoch Watkin James*	unopposed		
Liberal hold		Swing		

=== Bow Street ===
-->

Bow Street 1892
Party	Candidate	Votes	%	±%
Liberal	William Morgan*	85		
Conservative	Henry Bonsall	75		
Majority		10		
Liberal hold		Swing		

=== Cardigan North ===
Cardigan North 1892
Party	Candidate	Votes	%	±%
Liberal	Rev John Williams*	192		
Conservative	H.R. Daniel	174		
Majority		48		

=== Cardigan South ===
Cardigan South 1892
Party	Candidate	Votes	%	±%
Liberal	James Stephens	unopposed		

- There were boundary changes at Cardigan as the previous two-member ward was divided into two single-member wards. In 1889 one Conservative and one Liberal councillor has been elected.

=== Cilcennin ===
Cilcennin 1892
Party	Candidate	Votes	%	±%
Unionist	Dr Jenkin Lewis	148		
Liberal	John Davies*	93		
Majority		55		
Unionist gain from Liberal		Swing		

=== Cwmrheidol ===
-->

Cwmrheidol 1892
Party	Candidate	Votes	%	±%
Liberal	Isaac Jones	79		
Conservative	Capt. Nicholas Bray*	64		
Majority		15		
Liberal gain from Conservative		Swing		

=== Devil's Bridge ===
-->

Devil's Bridge 1892
Party	Candidate	Votes	%	±%
Liberal	David Jones	unopposed		
Liberal hold		Swing		

=== Goginan ===
-->

Goginan 1892
Party	Candidate	Votes	%	±%
Conservative	J.E. James	unopposed		
Conservative gain from Liberal		Swing		

=== Lampeter Borough ===
-->

Lampeter Borough 1892
Party	Candidate	Votes	%	±%
Conservative	David Lloyd	147		
Liberal	Thomas Owen	128		
Majority		19		
Conservative hold		Swing		

=== Llanarth ===
-->

Llanarth 1892
Party	Candidate	Votes	%	±%
Liberal	Morgan Evans*	unopposed		
Liberal hold		Swing		

=== Llanbadarn Fawr ===
-->

Llanbadarn Fawr 1892
Party	Candidate	Votes	%	±%
Conservative	Hugh Hughes	129		
Liberal	Rev Llewellyn Edwards**	97		
Majority		32		
Conservative hold		Swing		

=== Llanddewi Brefi ===
-->

Llanddewi Brefi 1892
Party	Candidate	Votes	%	±%
Conservative	D.W.E. Rowland	113		
Liberal	David Davies*	102		
Majority		11		
Conservative gain from Liberal		Swing		

=== Llandygwydd ===
-->

Llandygwydd 1892
Party	Candidate	Votes	%	±%
Conservative	Col. John Richard Howell	unopposed		
Conservative gain from Unionist		Swing		

=== Llandysul North ===
Llandysul North 1892
Party	Candidate	Votes	%	±%
Liberal	Rev T. Thomas*	151		
Liberal	Ben Davies	83		
Majority		68		

=== Llandysul South ===
Llandysul South 1892
Party	Candidate	Votes	%	±%
Liberal	Dr Enoch Davies*	174		
Conservative	Charles Lloyd MA	152		
Majority		22		

- There were boundary changes at Llandysul as the previous two-member ward was divided into two single-member wards. Liberal candidates held both seats in 1889 and 1892.

=== Llandysiliogogo ===
-->

Llansysiliogogo 1892
Party	Candidate	Votes	%	±%
Liberal	Evan Evans*	unopposed		
Liberal hold		Swing		

=== Llanfair Clydogau ===
-->

Llanfair Clydogau 1892
Party	Candidate	Votes	%	±%
Liberal	John Watkin Davies*	unopposed		
Liberal hold		Swing		

=== Llanfarian ===
-->

Llanfarian 1892
Party	Candidate	Votes	%	±%
Liberal	Vaughan Davies	117		
Conservative	Morris Davies*	89		
Majority		28		
Liberal gain from Conservative		Swing		

=== Llanfihangel y Creuddyn ===
-->

Llanfihangel y Creuddyn 1892
Party	Candidate	Votes	%	±%
Liberal	Evan Richards*	unopposed		
Liberal hold		Swing		

=== Llanfihangel Ystrad ===
Jenkin Jenkins, defeated in 1889 but subsequently made an alderman, successfully held the seat by a small margin.

-->

Llanfihangel Ystrad 1892
Party	Candidate	Votes	%	±%
Liberal	Jenkin Jenkins**	143		
Liberal	Walter Thomas Davies	138		
Majority		5		
Liberal hold		Swing		

=== Llangoedmor ===
-->

Llangoedmor 1892
Party	Candidate	Votes	%	±%
Liberal	William Owen Brigstocke*	Unopposed	N/A	N/A
Liberal hold				

=== Llangeitho ===
Llangeitho 1892
Party	Candidate	Votes	%	±%
Unionist	Robert Joseph Davies	Unopposed	N/A	N/A
Unionist gain from Liberal				

=== Llangrannog ===
-->

Llangrannog 1892
Party	Candidate	Votes	%	±%
Liberal	Rev J.H. Evans	unopposed		
Liberal hold		Swing		

=== Llanilar ===
-->

Llanilar 1892
Party	Candidate	Votes	%	±%
Liberal	Benjamin Jones	unopposed		
Liberal gain from Conservative		Swing		

=== Llanrhystyd ===
-->

Llanrhystyd 1892
Party	Candidate	Votes	%	±%
Liberal	James James*	134		
Conservative	Evan Jones	123		
Majority		11		
Liberal hold		Swing		

=== Llanllwchaiarn ===
Llanllwchaiarn 1892
Party	Candidate	Votes	%	±%
Liberal	Watkin Jones	unopposed		

- There were boundary changes at Llanllwchaiarn and New Quay as the previous two-member ward was divided into two single-member wards. Liberal candidates held both seats in 1889.

=== Llansantffraed ===
-->

Llansantffraed 1892
Party	Candidate	Votes	%	±%
Liberal	Capt. Daniel Jones**	112		
Conservative	William Hughes	83		
Majority		29		
Liberal gain from Conservative		Swing		

=== Llanwnen ===
-->

Llanwnen 1892
Party	Candidate	Votes	%	±%
Liberal	T.H.R. Hughes	unopposed		
Liberal hold		Swing		

=== Llanwenog ===
-->

Llanwenog 1892
Party	Candidate	Votes	%	±%
Conservative	Col. H. Davies-Evans*	unopposed		
Conservative hold		Swing		

=== Lledrod ===
-->

Lledrod 1892
Party	Candidate	Votes	%	±%
Liberal	Rev John Owens*	unopposed		
Liberal hold		Swing		

=== Nantcwnlle ===
-->

Nantcwnlle 1892
Party	Candidate	Votes	%	±%
Conservative	Jenkin Howells	123		
Liberal	W.J. Lloyd	101		
Majority		22		
Conservative gain from Liberal		Swing		

=== New Quay ===
There were boundary changes at Llanllwchaiarn and New Quay as the previous two-member ward was divided into two single-member wards. Liberal candidates held both seats in 1889.

New Quay 1892
Party	Candidate	Votes	%	±%
Conservative	Charles Edward Longcroft	142		
Liberal	J. Owen Davies*	97		
Majority		45		

=== Penbryn ===
-->

Penbryn 1892
Party	Candidate	Votes	%	±%
Liberal	Peter R. Beynon	112		
Liberal	David Griffiths*	109		
Majority		3		
Liberal hold		Swing		

=== Strata Florida ===
-->

Strata Florida 1892
Party	Candidate	Votes	%	±%
Conservative	John Jones	129		
Liberal	Rev John Bowen	108		
	David Jenkins	6		
Majority		21		
Conservative hold		Swing		

=== Taliesin ===
-->

Taliesin 1892
Party	Candidate	Votes	%	±%
Liberal	John Jones	unopposed		
Liberal hold		Swing		

=== Talybont ===
-->

Talybont 1892
Party	Candidate	Votes	%	±%
Liberal	Edward Jones	161		
Liberal	Evan James	89		
Majority		72		
Liberal hold		Swing		

=== Trefeurig ===
-->

Trefeurig 1892
Party	Candidate	Votes	%	±%
Liberal	Peter Jones*	unopposed		
Liberal hold		Swing		

=== Tregaron ===
-->

Tregaron 1892
Party	Candidate	Votes	%	±%
Liberal	Rees Jones	unopposed		
Liberal hold		Swing		

=== Troedyraur ===
-->

Troedyraur 1892
Party	Candidate	Votes	%	±%
Liberal	John Powell*	unopposed		
Liberal hold		Swing		

=== Ysbyty Ystwyth ===
-->

Ysbyty Ystwyth 1892
Party	Candidate	Votes	%	±%
Liberal	Rev T. Mason Jones	unopposed		
Liberal hold		Swing		

== Election of aldermen ==
In addition to the 48 councillors the council consisted of 16 county aldermen. Aldermen were elected by the council, and served a six-year term. Following the elections, eight aldermen were appointed by the newly elected council.

One retiring alderman was re-elected:

- Jenkin Jenkins, Blaenplwyf, Liberal (retiring alderman, elected councillor at Llanfihangel Ystrad)

In addition, seven new aldermen were elected:

- Peter Jones, Liberal (elected councillor at Trefeurig)
- Evan Richards, Liberal (elected councillor at Llanfihangel y Creuddyn)
- John Powell, Liberal (elected councillor at Troedyraur)
- Col. Herbert Davies-Evans, Conservative (elected councillor at Llanwenog)
- W.O. Brigstocke, Liberal (elected councillor at Llangoedmor)
- D.W.E. Rowland, Conservative (elected councillor at Llanddewi Brefi)
- Dr Jenkin Lewis, Conservative (elected councillor at Cilcennin)

The following aldermen were not re-elected:

- Earl Of Lisburne, Conservative
- Rev Llewellyn Edwards, Liberal
- Jenkin Jenkins (Aeronian), Liberal
- Daniel Jones, Liberal
- Rev John Davies, Liberal
- William Jones, Conservative
- Major Price Lewes, Conservative

== Aldermanic vacancies, 1892-98 ==
Colonel Davies-Evans decided not to accept a place on the aldermanic bench soon after the election. The Conservatives proposed that their nominee, David Lloyd, should occupy the vacancy but the Liberals were divided on the issue. In the ballot, Lloyd was elected by 19 votes against 18 for T.H.R. Hughes. As a result, the following appointment was made for six years in May 1892.

- David Lloyd, Conservative (elected councillor at Lampeter)

== 1892 by-elections following the election of aldermen ==
Six of the eight vacancies were filled unopposed and there were two contested elections. The Liberals captured all eight sets, including the three held by the Conservative or Unionist aldermen.

=== Cilcennin by-election ===
John Davies, elected in 1889, but defeated at the initial election, was returned unopposed.

Cilcennin by-election 1892
Party	Candidate	Votes	%	±%
Liberal	John Davies	unopposed		
Liberal gain from Unionist		Swing		

=== Llanddewi Brefi by-election ===
D.J. Williams, who formerly represented Tregaron won a narrow victory.

Llanddewi Brefi by-election 1892
Party	Candidate	Votes	%	±%
Liberal Unionist	D.J. Williams	100		
Liberal	David Davies	96		
Majority				
Liberal Unionist gain from Conservative		Swing		

=== Llanfihangel y Creuddyn by-election ===
Llanfihangel y Creuddyn by-election 1892
Party	Candidate	Votes	%	±%
Liberal	William Evans	unopposed		
Liberal hold		Swing		

=== Llanfihangel Ystrad by-election ===
Walter Davies had been narrowly defeated at the initial election. Jones was described as a working class candidate.

-->

Llanfihangel Ystrad by-election 1892
Party	Candidate	Votes	%	±%
Liberal	Walter Thomas Davies	186		
Conservative	David Jones	96		
Majority		90		
Liberal hold		Swing		

=== Llangoedmor by-election ===
Following W.O. Brigstocke's election as alderman, David Samuel Jones of Llwyngrawys was elected unopposed.

-->

Llangoedmor by-election 1892
Party	Candidate	Votes	%	±%
Liberal	David Samuel Jones	unopposed		
Liberal hold		Swing		

=== Llanwenog by-election ===
Following Colonel Davies-Evans's election as alderman his son was expected to contest the vacancy. However, he did not stand and Timothy Jones of Coedlanaufach, a farmer and Liberal, was returned unopposed.

Llanwenog by-election 1892
Party	Candidate	Votes	%	±%
Liberal	Timothy Jones	unopposed		
Liberal gain from Conservative		Swing		

=== Trefeurig by-election ===
-->

Trefeurig by-election 1892
Party	Candidate	Votes	%	±%
Liberal	Rev Llewellyn Edwards	unopposed		
Liberal hold		Swing		

=== Troedyraur by-election ===
-->

Troedyraur by-election 1892
Party	Candidate	Votes	%	±%
Liberal	John James Jones	unopposed		
Liberal hold		Swing		

== By-elections between 1892 and 1895 ==
=== New Quay by-election 1892 ===
There was also a by-election in New Quay following the death of Captain Longcroft within a few days of the election. In a close contest, Sir Marteine Lloyd of Bronwydd, famously defeated in 1889, narrowly defeated the former councillor John Owen Davies, holding the seat for the Conservatives.

New Quay by-election 1892
Party	Candidate	Votes	%	±%
Conservative	Sir Marteine Lloyd			
Liberal	John Owen Davies			
Conservative hold		Swing		

=== Lampeter by-election 1892 ===
Lampeter by-election 1892
Party	Candidate	Votes	%	±%
Conservative	J.C. Harford	unopposed		
Conservative hold		Swing		

=== Lledrod by-election 1892 ===
Roderick Lloyd (elected alderman in 1889) resigned on being appointed county surveyor and the Rev John Owen was elected in his place. In the resulting by-election two candidates were nominated. William Bebb withdrew too late to avoid an election but received no votes at the ensuing ballot.

Lledrod by-election 1892
Party	Candidate	Votes	%	±%
Liberal	John Williams	unopposed		
Liberal hold		Swing		

=== Llangeitho by-election 1892 ===
This by-election followed the death of Robert Joseph Davies

Llangeitho by-election 1892
Party	Candidate	Votes	%	±%
	John Jones	unopposed		
	Unionist gain from Liberal	Swing		

=== Aberystwyth Division 3 by-election 1892 ===
A by-election took place on 29 November 1892 following the death of John James. The Liberals retained the seat.

Aberystwyth Division 3 by-election 1892
Party	Candidate	Votes	%	±%
Liberal	J.W. Szlumper	160		
Conservative	John Morgan	128		
Liberal hold		Swing		
