= 1898 Cardiganshire County Council election =

1898 Welsh local election

The fourth election for Cardiganshire County Council took place in March 1898. They were preceded by the 1895 election and followed by the 1901 election

== Overview of the result ==
At the fourth elections held for the County Council, the Liberals retained their large majority.

== Boundary changes ==
There were boundary changes in the Aberaeron area, arising from the formation of the Aberaeron Urban District Council in 1894.

== Unopposed returns ==
There were a number of unopposed returns. The Conservatives held seats they won in 1895 including Borth and Cardigan South while Independent Conservative Henry Bonsall was returned unopposed for Bow Street.

== Contested elections ==
The Liberals won Aberystwyth No.1, lost in 1895, after the Unionists failed to field a candidate.

== Retiring aldermen ==
Eight aldermen retired. Of these only Peter Jones (Trefeurig) and Jenkin Jenkins (Felinfach) sought re-election, although two others (John Powell and Evan Richards) would be re-elected without facing the electorate. Jenkins was defeated at Felinfach by Walter T. Davies. Davies, however was among those who were chosen as new aldermen enabling Jenkins to contest the by-election (see below). Four aldermen retired namely W.O. Brigstocke, Dr Jenkin Lewis, David Lloyd and D.W. E. Rowland.

== The New council ==
J.C. Harford of Falcondale was elected as the first Conservative chairman on a motion moved by Peter Jones.

Cardiganshire County Council 1898 : elected members
Party	Seats	Gains	Losses	Net gain/loss	Seats %	Votes %	Votes	+/−
Liberal	39	4	1	+3				
Conservative	8	1	4	-3				
Liberal Unionist								
Ind. Conservative	1	0	0	0				

=== Council following the election of aldermen and by-elections ===
Cardiganshire County Council 1898 : following the election of aldermen
Party	Seats	Gains	Losses	Net gain/loss	Seats %	Votes %	Votes	+/−
Liberal	50							
Conservative	9							
Liberal Unionist	0							
Ind. Conservative	1							
Independent	0							

Cardiganshire County Council 1898 : following by-elections
Party	Seats	Gains	Losses	Net gain/loss	Seats %	Votes %	Votes	+/−
Liberal	53	0	0	0				
Conservative	10	0	0	0				
Liberal Unionist	0	0	0	0				
Ind. Conservative	1	0	0	0				
Independent								

== Division results ==
=== Aberaeron ===
Aberaeron 1898
Party	Candidate	Votes	%	±%
Liberal	John Morgan Howell*	unopposed		
Liberal hold		Swing		

=== Aberarth ===
Aberarth 1898
Party	Candidate	Votes	%	±%
Liberal	Evan Lima Jones*	unopposed		
Liberal hold		Swing		

=== Aberbanc ===
David Lloyd, an alderman from 1889 to 1895 was returned unopposed.

Aberbanc 1898
Party	Candidate	Votes	%	±%
Liberal	Dr David Lloyd*	unopposed		
Liberal hold		Swing		

=== Aberporth ===
Aberporth 1898
Party	Candidate	Votes	%	±%
Liberal	Joshua Hughes*	unopposed		
Liberal hold		Swing		

=== Aberystwyth Division 1 ===
Aberystwyth Division 1 1898
Party	Candidate	Votes	%	±%
Liberal	Robert Doughton	unopposed		
Liberal gain from Unionist		Swing		

=== Aberystwyth Division 2 ===
Aberystwyth Division 2 1898
Party	Candidate	Votes	%	±%
Liberal	David Charles Roberts*	unopposed		
Liberal hold		Swing		

=== Aberystwyth Division 3 ===
A repeat of the contest in 1895. Ellis increased his majority from 7 to 29.

Aberystwyth Division 3 1898
Party	Candidate	Votes	%	±%
Liberal	Robert Ellis	186		
Conservative	Dr Thomas Pugh Beddoes	157		
Majority		29		
Liberal hold		Swing		

=== Aberystwyth Division 4 ===
James had been elected at the 1895 by-election following C.M. Williams's re-appointment as alderman.

Aberystwyth Division 4 1898
Party	Candidate	Votes	%	±%
Liberal	Evan Hugh James*	158		
Conservative	John Morgan	133		
Majority		25		
Liberal hold		Swing		

=== Borth ===
Borth 1898
Party	Candidate	Votes	%	±%
Conservative	John Morgan Williams*	unopposed		
Conservative hold		Swing		

=== Bow Street ===
Bow Street 1898
Party	Candidate	Votes	%	±%
Ind. Conservative	Henry Bonsall	unopposed		
Ind. Conservative hold		Swing		

=== Cardigan North ===
Cardigan North 1898
Party	Candidate	Votes	%	±%
Liberal	Rev John Williams*	unopposed		
Liberal hold		Swing		

=== Cardigan South ===
Cardigan South 1898
Party	Candidate	Votes	%	±%
Conservative	C.E.D. Morgan-Richardson	unopposed		
Conservative hold		Swing		

=== Cilcennin ===
Jenkin Lewis had previously sat as a Unionist.

Cilcennin 1898
Party	Candidate	Votes	%	±%
Liberal	Dr Jenkin Lewis**	146		
Conservative	Price Lewes	96		
Majority		50		
Liberal hold		Swing		

=== Cwmrheidol ===
The seat changed hands for the third time, with Nicholas Bray, the victor in 1889 and 1895 being defeated as he was in 1892.

Cwmrheidol 1898
Party	Candidate	Votes	%	±%
Liberal	John Morgan	90		
Conservative	Capt. Nicholas Bray*	44		
Majority		46		
Liberal gain from Conservative		Swing		

=== Devil's Bridge ===
Devil's Bridge 1898
Party	Candidate	Votes	%	±%
Liberal	Abraham Thomas Joseph	114		
Conservative	William Thomas Hill	50		
Majority		64		
Liberal hold		Swing		

=== Felinfach ===
The sitting councillor defeated Alderman Jenkin Jenkins, who had defeated him by a small majority in 1892.

Felinfach 1898
Party	Candidate	Votes	%	±%
Liberal	Walter Thomas Davies*	177		
Liberal	Jenkin Jenkins**	109		
Majority		68		
Liberal hold		Swing		

=== Goginan ===
Goginan 1898
Party	Candidate	Votes	%	±%
Liberal	Joseph Parry	unopposed		
Liberal hold		Swing		

=== Lampeter Borough ===
Harford, was again returned unopposed.

Lampeter Borough 1898
Party	Candidate	Votes	%	±%
Conservative	John Charles Harford*	unopposed		
Conservative hold		Swing		

=== Llanarth ===
Llanarth 1898
Party	Candidate	Votes	%	±%
Liberal	James Evans*	unopposed		
Liberal hold		Swing		

=== Llanbadarn Fawr ===
Llanbadarn Fawr 1898
Party	Candidate	Votes	%	±%
Conservative	Major H.E. Bonsall	unopposed		
Conservative hold		Swing		

=== Llanddewi Brefi ===
Llanddewi Brefi 1898
Party	Candidate	Votes	%	±%
Liberal	David Davies*	153		
Conservative	William Rees	46		
Majority		107		
Liberal hold		Swing		

=== Llandygwydd ===
Llandygwydd 1898
Party	Candidate	Votes	%	±%
Conservative	Col. John Richard Howell*	unopposed		
Conservative hold		Swing		

=== Llandysiliogogo ===
Llansysiliogogo 1898
Party	Candidate	Votes	%	±%
Liberal	Rev R. Jones	unopposed		
Liberal hold		Swing		

=== Llandysul North ===
Llandysul North 1898
Party	Candidate	Votes	%	±%
Liberal	Daniel Evans	unopposed		

=== Llandysul South ===
Llandysul South 1898
Party	Candidate	Votes	%	±%
Liberal	Rev Thomas Pennant Phillips	208		
Conservative	Charles Lloyd*	191		
Majority		18		
Liberal gain from Conservative		Swing		

=== Llanfair Clydogau ===
Llanfair Clydogau 1898
Party	Candidate	Votes	%	±%
Liberal	John Jenkin Davies	150		
Liberal	John Watkin Davies*	131		
Majority		19		
Liberal hold		Swing		

=== Llanfarian ===
Llanfarian 1898
Party	Candidate	Votes	%	±%
Liberal	Vaughan Davies*	135		
Independent	Richard John Roberts	60		
Majority		75		
Liberal hold		Swing		

=== Llanfihangel y Creuddyn ===
Llanfihangel y Creuddyn 1898
Party	Candidate	Votes	%	±%
Liberal	William Evans*	unopposed		
Liberal hold		Swing		

=== Llangoedmor ===
Llangoedmor 1898
Party	Candidate	Votes	%	±%
Liberal	David Samuel Jones*	unopposed		
Liberal hold		Swing		

=== Llangeitho ===
Llangeitho 1898
Party	Candidate	Votes	%	±%
Liberal	Thomas Davies	158		
Liberal	John Rowlands*	130		
Majority		28		
Liberal hold		Swing		

=== Llangrannog ===
Llangrannog 1898
Party	Candidate	Votes	%	±%
Liberal	Thomas Evans*	unopposed		
Liberal hold		Swing		

=== Llanilar ===
Llanilar 1898
Party	Candidate	Votes	%	±%
Liberal	Benjamin Jones*	unopposed		
Liberal hold		Swing		

=== Llanllwchaiarn ===
Llanllwchaiarn 1898
Party	Candidate	Votes	%	±%
Liberal	Rev William Griffiths*	unopposed		
Liberal hold		Swing		

=== Llanrhystyd ===
Llanrhystyd 1898
Party	Candidate	Votes	%	±%
Conservative	Evan Jones*	unopposed		
Conservative hold		Swing		

=== Llansantffraed ===
Llansantffraed 1898
Party	Candidate	Votes	%	±%
Conservative	Evan Morgan*	132		
Liberal	David Morgan	100		
Majority		32		
Conservative hold		Swing		

=== Llanwenog ===
Llanwenog 1898
Party	Candidate	Votes	%	±%
Conservative	Herbert Davies-Evans jnr.	196		
Liberal	James Jones	122		
Majority		74		
Conservative gain from Liberal		Swing		

=== Llanwnen ===
Llanwnen 1898
Party	Candidate	Votes	%	±%
Liberal	John Daniel Jenkins	124		
Conservative	S.D. Jones	66		
Majority		58		
Liberal hold		Swing		

=== Lledrod ===
Lledrod 1898
Party	Candidate	Votes	%	±%
Liberal	David Jenkins*	unopposed		
Liberal hold		Swing		

=== Nantcwnlle ===
Nantcwnlle 1898
Party	Candidate	Votes	%	±%
Liberal	Daniel Jenkins	122		
Conservative	John Jones	109		
Majority		13		
Liberal hold		Swing		

=== New Quay ===
New Quay 1898
Party	Candidate	Votes	%	±%
Liberal	John Owen Davies	149		
Conservative	Thomas Davies	120		
Majority		29		
Liberal gain from Conservative		Swing		

=== Penbryn ===
Penbryn 1898
Party	Candidate	Votes	%	±%
Liberal	Capt. D. Jones	unopposed		
Liberal hold		Swing		

=== Strata Florida ===
Strata Florida 1898
Party	Candidate	Votes	%	±%
Liberal	Edward Evans	unopposed		
Liberal hold		Swing		

=== Taliesin ===
Taliesin 1898
Party	Candidate	Votes	%	±%
Liberal	John Jones*	unopposed		
Liberal hold		Swing		

=== Talybont ===
Talybont 1898
Party	Candidate	Votes	%	±%
Liberal	Edward Jones*	unopposed		
Liberal hold		Swing		

=== Trefeurig ===
Trefeurig 1898
Party	Candidate	Votes	%	±%
Liberal	Peter Jones**	unopposed		
Liberal hold		Swing		

=== Tregaron ===
Tregaron 1898
Party	Candidate	Votes	%	±%
Liberal	Daniel Jenkin Williams*	unopposed		
Liberal hold		Swing		

=== Troedyraur ===
Troedyraur 1898
Party	Candidate	Votes	%	±%
Liberal	Thomas Morris	unopposed		
Liberal hold		Swing		

=== Ysbyty Ystwyth ===
Ysbyty Ystwyth 1898
Party	Candidate	Votes	%	±%
Liberal	Thomas Morgan	unopposed		
Liberal hold		Swing		

== Election of Aldermen ==
In addition to the 48 councillors the council consisted of 16 county aldermen. Aldermen were elected by the council, and served a six-year term. Following the elections, the following Alderman were appointed by the newly elected council.

- Peter Jones, Liberal (retiring alderman, elected councillor at Trefeurig)
- Sir Marteine Lloyd, Conservative (from outside the Council, retiring councillor for New Quay)
- Evan Richards, Liberal (retiring alderman, from outside Council - did not seek election)
- John Morgan Howell, Liberal (elected councillor at Aberaeron)
- Walter T. Davies, Liberal (elected councillor at Felinfach)
- Rev John Williams, Liberal (elected councillor at Cardigan North)
- John Powell, Liberal (retiring alderman, from outside Council - did not seek election)
- Rev T. Mason Jones, Liberal (from outside the Council, retiring member for Ysbyty Ystwyth)

With the exception of Sir Marteine Lloyd, of the eight elected aldermen were Liberals. This broke the pattern established in 1889 whereby there were three Conservatives on the aldermanic bench. Of those elected, four were elected members of the Council and four were not. Two retiring aldermen (John Powell and Evan Richards) did not seek re-election although Peter Jones did so. Sir Marteine Lloyd and Rev T. Mason Jones were members of the previous council who did not seek re-election.

== 1898 by-elections following the election of aldermen ==
Only two of the four by-elections was contested.

=== Aeron by-election ===
Following the election of J.M. Howell as alderman, a disagreement among local Liberals led to the unopposed return of a prominent Conservative.

Aeron by-election 1898
Party	Candidate	Votes	%	±%
Conservative	Major Price Lewes	unopposed		
Conservative gain from Liberal		Swing		

=== Cardigan North by-election ===
Following the election of the Rev John Williams as alderman, O. Beynon Evans was returned unopposed.

Cardigan North by-election 1898
Party	Candidate	Votes	%	±%
Liberal	O. Beynon Evans	unopposed		
Liberal hold		Swing		

=== Felinfach by-election ===
Having lost the election, as retiring alderman, to the retiring councillor, Jenkin Jenkins of Blaenplwyf was returned.

Felinfach by-election 1898
Party	Candidate	Votes	%	±%
Liberal	Jenkin Jenkins	144		
Unionist	Evan Jonathan	104		
Liberal	D. Teify Jones	41		
Majority		40		
Liberal hold		Swing		

=== Trefeurig by-election ===
Trefeurig by-election 1898
Party	Candidate	Votes	%	±%
Liberal	J. Hugh Edwards	unopposed		
Liberal hold		Swing		
