= 1901 Cardiganshire County Council election =

1901 Welsh local election

The fifth election for Cardiganshire County Council took place in March 1901. They were preceded by the 1898 election and followed by the 1904 election.

== Overview of the results ==
The Liberals once again won by a large majority but there were signs that elections were becoming less political, with candidates of similar political persuasions opposing each other and some candidates not openly declaring any political affiliation. Neither the Cambrian News or the Aberystwyth Observer indicated party affiliation although the Brython Cymreig did so in relation to the contested elections only. The Welsh Gazette commented that while the contests at Aberystwyth were on political lines, many of those in the rural areas were between candidates whose political views were often indistinguishable. In many ways this reflected the changes in the politics of the county, now represented at Westminster by the former Conservative, Matthew Vaughan Davies.

== Contested elections ==
The vast majority of councillors were elected unopposed. Only ten of the 48 wards were contested at the election.

== Retiring aldermen ==
Eight aldermen retired, all of whom were Liberals. Of these only Morgan Evans in Llanarth and James Stephens in Cardigan South sought election. Neither was re-elected an alderman. Of those who stood down, J.H. Davies, Enoch Davies and Daniel Jones retired from county politics but C.M. Williams, T.H.R. Hughes and J.T. Morgan were later re-elected aldermen (the latter for the second time) without facing the electorate. This was the first occasion upon which those aldermen later re-elected had not faced the electorate.

== The new council ==
Cardiganshire County Council 1901 : elected members
Party	Seats	Gains	Losses	Net gain/loss	Seats %	Votes %	Votes	+/−
Liberal	38	3	3	0				
Conservative	6	0	3	-3				
Liberal Unionist	3	3	0	+3				
Ind. Conservative	1	0	0	0				

Cardiganshire County Council 1901 : elected members and sitting aldermen
Party	Seats	Gains	Losses	Net gain/loss	Seats %	Votes %	Votes	+/−
Liberal								
Conservative								
Liberal Unionist								
Independent								

Cardiganshire County Council 1901 : following election of new aldermen and by-elections
Party	Seats	Gains	Losses	Net gain/loss	Seats %	Votes %	Votes	+/−
Liberal								
Conservative								
Liberal Unionist								
Independent								

== Division results ==
=== Aberaeron ===
Aberaeron 1901
Party	Candidate	Votes	%	±%
Liberal	E. Lima Jones	145		
Liberal	Rev Gwilym Evans	109		
Majority		36		
Liberal hold		Swing		

=== Aberbanc ===
Aberbanc 1901
Party	Candidate	Votes	%	±%
Liberal	David Lloyd*	unopposed		
Liberal hold		Swing		

=== Aberporth ===
Aberporth 1901
Party	Candidate	Votes	%	±%
Liberal	Thomas Watkins	unopposed		
Liberal hold		Swing		

=== Aberystwyth Division 1 ===
Aberystwyth Division 1 1901
Party	Candidate	Votes	%	±%
Unionist	R.J. Jones	182		
Liberal	Robert Doughton*	108		
Majority		74		
Unionist gain from Liberal		Swing		

=== Aberystwyth Division 2 ===
Aberystwyth Division 2 1901
Party	Candidate	Votes	%	±%
Liberal	D.C. Roberts*	unopposed		
Liberal hold		Swing		

=== Aberystwyth Division 3 ===
Aberystwyth Division 3 1901
Party	Candidate	Votes	%	±%
Liberal	Robert Ellis	172		
Conservative	T.E. Salmon	150		
Majority		22		
Liberal hold		Swing		

=== Aberystwyth Division 4 ===
Aberystwyth Division 4 1901
Party	Candidate	Votes	%	±%
Liberal	E.H. James	164		
Conservative	John Morgan	127		
Majority		37		
Liberal hold		Swing		

=== Aeron ===
Aeron 1901
Party	Candidate	Votes	%	±%
Unionist	Thomas Jenkins	128		
Liberal	John Jones	117		
Majority		11		
Unionist win (new seat)				

=== Borth ===
Borth 1901
Party	Candidate	Votes	%	±%
Conservative	J.M. Williams	unopposed		
Conservative hold		Swing		

=== Bow Street ===
Bow Street 1901
Party	Candidate	Votes	%	±%
Ind. Conservative	Henry Bonsall	unopposed		
Ind. Conservative hold		Swing		

=== Cardigan North ===
Cardigan North 1901
Party	Candidate	Votes	%	±%
Liberal	O. Beynon Evans*	unopposed		
Liberal hold		Swing		

=== Cardigan South ===
Cardigan South 1901
Party	Candidate	Votes	%	±%
Liberal	James Stephens	unopposed		
Liberal gain from Conservative		Swing		

=== Cilcennin ===
Jenkin Lewis was described as a Liberal candidate in one newspaper but this may not have been correct.

Cilcennin
Party	Candidate	Votes	%	±%
Liberal	Dr Jenkin Lewis	145		
Unionist	Jenkin Morgan Jones	78		
Majority		67		
Liberal hold		Swing		

=== Cwmrheidol ===
Cwmrheidol 1901
Party	Candidate	Votes	%	±%
Liberal	William Evans*	unopposed		
Liberal hold		Swing		

=== Devil's Bridge ===
Devil's Bridge 1901
Party	Candidate	Votes	%	±%
Liberal	Rev Gwmryn Jones*	unopposed		
Liberal hold		Swing		

=== Felinfach ===
Llanfihangel Ystrad 1901
Party	Candidate	Votes	%	±%
Liberal	Dr Evan Evans			
Liberal hold		Swing		

=== Goginan ===
Goginan 1901
Party	Candidate	Votes	%	±%
Liberal	J.R. James*	unopposed		
Liberal gain from Conservative		Swing		

=== Lampeter Borough ===
Lampeter Borough 1901
Party	Candidate	Votes	%	±%
Conservative	John Charles Harford*	unopposed		
Conservative hold		Swing		

=== Llanarth ===
Llanarth 1901
Party	Candidate	Votes	%	±%
Liberal	Morgan Evans*	unopposed		
Liberal hold		Swing		

=== Llanbadarn Fawr ===
Llanbadarn Fawr
Party	Candidate	Votes	%	±%
Conservative	J.J. Bonsall	unopposed		
Conservative hold		Swing		

=== Llanddewi Brefi ===
Llanddewi Brefi 1901
Party	Candidate	Votes	%	±%
Liberal	David Davies*	unopposed		
Liberal hold		Swing		

=== Llandygwydd ===
Llandygwydd 1901
Party	Candidate	Votes	%	±%
Conservative	Col. J.R. Howell*	unopposed		
Conservative hold		Swing		

=== Llandysul North ===
Llandysul North 1901
Party	Candidate	Votes	%	±%
Liberal	David Evans*	147		
Liberal hold		Swing		

=== Llandysul South ===
Llandysul South 1901
Party	Candidate	Votes	%	±%
Liberal	Rev T. Pennant Phillips	unopposed		
Liberal hold		Swing		

=== Llansysiliogogo ===
Llansysiliogogo 1901
Party	Candidate	Votes	%	±%
Liberal	Thomas Thomas	unopposed		
Liberal hold		Swing		

=== Llanfair Clydogau ===
Llanfair Clydogau 1901
Party	Candidate	Votes	%	±%
Unionist	William Rees	134		
Liberal	J.J. Davies*	117		
Majority		17		
Unionist gain from Liberal		Swing		

=== Llanfarian ===
Llanfarian 1901
Party	Candidate	Votes	%	±%
Liberal	Vaughan Davies	Unopposed	N/A	N/A
Liberal hold				

=== Llanfihangel y Creuddyn ===
Llanfihangel y Creuddyn 1901
Party	Candidate	Votes	%	±%
Liberal	David Morgans	151		
Conservative	David Morgans	69		
Liberal hold		Swing		

=== Llangoedmor ===
Llangoedmor 1901
Party	Candidate	Votes	%	±%
Liberal	D. Samuel Jones	unopposed		
Liberal hold		Swing		

=== Llangeitho ===
Llangeitho 1901
Party	Candidate	Votes	%	±%
Liberal	Thomas Davies	unopposed		
Liberal hold		Swing		

=== Llangrannog ===
Llangrannog 1901
Party	Candidate	Votes	%	±%
Liberal	Thomas Evans*	unopposed		
Liberal hold		Swing		

=== Llanilar ===
Llanilar 1901
Party	Candidate	Votes	%	±%
Liberal	Benjamin Jones*	unopposed		
Liberal hold		Swing		

=== Llanrhystyd ===
Llanrhystyd 1901
Party	Candidate	Votes	%	±%
Conservative	David Morgan	156		
Liberal	John Ellis	73		
Conservative hold		Swing		

=== Llanllwchaiarn ===
Llanllwchaiarn 1901
Party	Candidate	Votes	%	±%
Liberal	Rev William Griffiths*	unopposed		
Liberal hold		Swing		

=== Llansantffraed ===
Llansantffraed 1901
Party	Candidate	Votes	%	±%
Conservative	Evan Morgan	137		
Liberal	L. Davies	53		
Majority		18		
Conservative hold		Swing		

=== Llanwnen ===
Llanwnen 1901
Party	Candidate	Votes	%	±%
Liberal	William Davies	unopposed		
Liberal hold		Swing		

=== Llanwenog ===
Llanwenog 1901
Party	Candidate	Votes	%	±%
Liberal	James Jones	unopposed		
Liberal gain from Conservative		Swing		

=== Lledrod ===
Lledrod 1901
Party	Candidate	Votes	%	±%
Liberal	David Jenkins*	unopposed		
Liberal hold		Swing		

=== Nantcwnlle ===
Nantcwnlle
Party	Candidate	Votes	%	±%
Liberal	Daniel Jenkins	unopposed		
Liberal hold		Swing		

=== New Quay ===
New Quay 1901
Party	Candidate	Votes	%	±%
Liberal	Evan James Davies	unopposed		
Liberal hold		Swing		

=== Penbryn ===
Penbryn 1901
Party	Candidate	Votes	%	±%
Liberal	David Jones	unopposed		
Liberal hold		Swing		

=== Strata Florida ===
Strata Florida 1901
Party	Candidate	Votes	%	±%
Liberal	Edward Evans	unopposed		
Liberal hold		Swing		

=== Taliesin ===
Taliesin 1901
Party	Candidate	Votes	%	±%
Liberal	David Williams	unopposed		
Liberal hold		Swing		

=== Talybont ===
Talybont 1901
Party	Candidate	Votes	%	±%
Liberal	Edward Jones*	unopposed		
Liberal hold		Swing		

=== Trefeurig ===
Trefeurig
Party	Candidate	Votes	%	±%
Liberal	J. Hugh Edwards	Unopposed	N/A	N/A
Liberal hold				

=== Tregaron ===
Tregaron 1901
Party	Candidate	Votes	%	±%
Liberal	D.J. Williams	unopposed		
Liberal hold		Swing		

=== Troedyraur ===
Troedyraur 1901
Party	Candidate	Votes	%	±%
Liberal	Thomas Morris	unopposed		
Liberal hold		Swing		

=== Ysbyty Ystwyth ===
Ysbyty Ystwyth
Party	Candidate	Votes	%	±%
Liberal	Thomas Morgan	unopposed		
Liberal hold		Swing		

== Election of Aldermen ==
Once again a number of aldermen who had not faced the electorate were elected. C.M. Williams and J.T. Morgan were elected aldermen for a third term (although the latter had not faced the electorate since 1889) and T.H.R. Hughes and James James for a second term. James James had been elected, from outside the Council, to an aldermanic vacancy in 1895 and so had never faced an election. David Lloyd, previously an alderman from 1889 until 1892 was elected for a second term. The other four aldermen were new appointments, including one Conservative, Colonel J.R. Howell.

- C. M. Williams, Liberal (retiring alderman, from outside Council - did not seek election)
- T. H. R. Hughes, Liberal (retiring alderman, from outside Council - did not seek election)
- D.J. Wiliams, Liberal (elected councillor at Tregaron)
- Col. J.R. Howell, Conservative (elected councillor at Llandygwydd)
- Dr David Lloyd, Liberal (elected councillor at Aberbanc)
- Rev William Griffiths, Liberal (elected councillor at Llanllwchaiarn)
- James James, Liberal (retiring alderman, from outside Council - did not seek election)
- J.T. Morgan, Liberal (retiring alderman, from outside Council - did not seek election)

== 1901 by-elections following the election of aldermen ==
Three of the subsequent by-elections were contested.

=== Aberbanc by-election ===
Evan Davies, who had previously represented the ward from 1889 until 1895, was elected unopposed following David Lloyd's election as alderman.

Aberbanc by-election 1901
Party	Candidate	Votes	%	±%
Liberal	Evan Davies	unopposed		
Liberal hold		Swing		

=== Llandygwydd by-election ===
Llandygwydd by-election 1904
Party	Candidate	Votes	%	±%
Liberal	Augustus Brigstocke	150		
Conservative	Capt. Webley Parry Pryse	149		
Majority		1		
Liberal gain from Conservative		Swing		

=== Llanllwchaiarn by-election ===
Llanllwchaiarn by-election 1904
Party	Candidate	Votes	%	±%
Liberal	William Morgan	89		
Liberal	Joshua Lewis	75		
Majority		14		
Liberal hold		Swing		

=== Tregaron by-election ===
Tregaron by-election 1901
Party	Candidate	Votes	%	±%
Liberal	Dr Evan Lloyd	210		
Conservative	R.S. Rowland	104		
Majority		106		
Liberal hold		Swing		
