= 1889 Cardiganshire County Council election =

1889 Welsh local election

All 64 seats to Cardiganshire County Council 33 seats needed for a majority
	First party	Second party	Third party
Party	Liberal	Conservative	Liberal Unionist
Seats won	50/64	13/64	1/64
Councillors	37	10	1
Aldermen	13	3	0
	Fourth party
Party	Independent
Seats won	0/64
Councillors	0
Aldermen	0
Council control after election
Liberal
Liberal Party

The first election to the Cardiganshire County Council was held across the west Wales county of Cardiganshire in January 1889. It was followed by the 1892 election. The county was divided into numerous single member wards with two councillors elected to represent Cardigan, Lampeter, New Quay and Llandysul, and four to represent the town of Aberystwyth. 37 Liberals, 10 Conservatives and 1 Unionist were returned.

== Overview of the result ==
1889 was one of those landmark years in the history of Welsh Liberalism, a coming of age symbolized by the triumph across Wales of Liberal candidates in the inaugural county council elections. Nowhere was this more striking than in Cardiganshire, where a little over twenty years previously the evictions controversy had been at its most apparent. Welsh historiography has, likewise, emphasised the contests in Cardiganshire, citing particular contests (such as those noted below), as symbolic of what occurred throughout Wales. If 1868 saw the cracking of the ice, wrote one historian, 1889 was the year of the flood. Only three major landowners were returned, namely Lord Lisburne, Herbert Davies-Evans (the Lord Lieutenant of the County) and J.C. Harford of Falcondale.

== Candidates ==
39 of the 48 seats were contested and majorities were small in many wards. In most cases there were contests between Liberal and Conservative candidates. In some wards, a form of 'primary' election took place to decide upon who should run as the Liberal candidate, although in others Liberal candidates fought each other. There were fewer instances where two Conservatives contested a seat.

There were only nine unopposed returns, all of whom were Liberals with the exception of Lord Lisburne in Strata Florida.

In some cases there is an ambiguity in the sources over the party affiliations and this is explained below where relevant.

== Outcome ==
While many wards were hotly contested and the majorities small, in single figures in some instances, the Liberals could be considered to have scored a landslide victory. Some of the victories have been regarded as an illustration of the social changes that had taken place in the county. At Devil's Bridge, T.J. Waddingham of Hafod was defeated by the local postmaster; in Bow Street, a coal merchant (and grandfather of Elystan Morgan, later the only Labour MP to represent the county) defeated Henry Bonsall of Clarach; while in Troedyraur, Sir Marteine Lloyd, a former Conservative parliamentary candidate was defeated by a local farmer.

The local Conservative-inclined newspapers, notably the Aberystwyth Observer emphasised that local authorities were intended to be non-political and that ‘the best men’ should be elected. A few Conservative candidates, who were usually landlords, scored personal victories against the tide. Most notably the Lord Lieutenant, H. Davies-Evans won by 27 votes in Llanwenog and in neighbouring Lampeter, J.C. Harford of Falcondale had a majority of 14 over the Liberal candidate, local doctor Abel Evans. In Llanfarian two Conservatives faced each other, with Morris Davies holding off the future Liberal MP for the county, Vaughan Davies of Tanybwlch.

The contest at Aberystwyth, which led to the return of four Liberal candidates, was considered to be somewhat quiet compared with municipal contests. In Cardigan, nominally the county town, a closely fought contest led to the return of the Conservative candidate, Picton Evans and one of the two Liberals, the former Liberal Unionist Levi James.

In some wards, such as Aberaeron and Borth, there was more excitement, with bonfires being lit to celebrate the return of the successful candidates.

Sixteen aldermen were elected by the new council. Eight were elected from among the elected members and eight from outside the council.

== Ward results ==
=== Aberaeron ===
John Morgan Howell, an ironmonger and already a prominent figure in the public life of the county, and destined to remain so for many years, was returned with a decisive majority over John Griffiths, Nantgwynfynydd, a farmer. It was reported that, following the declaration of the result, the children of Aberarth British School were marched to the town and, in front of Howell's residence and that of the successful candidate at Aberarth (see below) instructed to give each a hearty cheer, which they did. After dark blue balls were sent off and bonfires were lit.

Aberaeron 1889
Party	Candidate	Votes	%	±%
Liberal	John Morgan Howell	204		
Conservative	John Griffiths	103		
Majority		101		
Liberal win (new seat)				

=== Aberarth ===
John Hugh Jones, an Aberaeron draper, defeated T.H. Maddy of Dolaeron, a barrister.

Aberarth 1889
Party	Candidate	Votes	%	±%
Liberal	John Hugh Jones	163		
Conservative	Thomas Herbert Maddy	69		
Majority		104		
Liberal win (new seat)				

=== Aberbanc ===
Aberbanc 1889
Party	Candidate	Votes	%	±%
Liberal	Evan Davies	Unopposed		
Liberal win (new seat)				

=== Aberystwyth (four seats) ===
The result in Aberystwyth, after a lively contest, led to the return of the four Liberal candidates. C.M. Williams ( a draper), John James (another tradesman) and George Green (owner of the local foundry) were long-standing members of the Aberystwyth Town Council, the first two being aldermen. The fourth candidate, Thomas Levi, was a well-known figure in cultural and religious circles. John Morgan, who finished bottom of the poll, was the owner of the Aberystwyth Observer.

Aberystwyth 1889
Party	Candidate	Votes	%	±%
Liberal	C.M. Williams	681		
Liberal	John James	610		
Liberal	George Green	563		
Liberal	Rev Thomas Levi	534		
Conservative	B.E. Morgan	498		
Conservative	J. Morgan	336		
Liberal win (new seat)				
Liberal win (new seat)				
Liberal win (new seat)				
Liberal win (new seat)				

=== Blaenporth ===
Thomas Thomas, a farmer, of Plas, Aberporth, defeated Alexander Jenkins of Penrallt, Aberporth.

Blaenporth 1889
Party	Candidate	Votes	%	±%
Liberal	Thomas Thomas	178		
Conservative	Major-General Alexander Jenkins	75		
Majority		103		
Liberal win (new seat)				

=== Borth ===
The return of the local Calvinistic Methodist minister was greeted with considerable enthusiasm. Flags were displayed and, after nightfall, bonfires lighted, fireworks discharged, houses illuminated, and hundreds of people paraded the streets up to a late hour. James and some of his supporters were drawn in an open carriage through the village and, addressing the assembly said that the day was rapidly approach- ing when laws would be made by the people for the people.

Borth 1889
Party	Candidate	Votes	%	±%
Liberal	Rev Enoch Watkin James	134		
Conservative	John Morgan Williams	108		
Majority		26		
Liberal win (new seat)				

=== Bow Street ===
Bow Street 1889
Party	Candidate	Votes	%	±%
Liberal	William Morgan	92		
Conservative	Henry Bonsall	83		
Majority		9		
Liberal win (new seat)				

=== Cardigan Borough (two seats) ===
The contest had been noted for claims by the Conservatives that it should not be based on politics. On the declaration of the result and the return of Picton Evans at the head of the poll the bells of the parish church were rung, the traditional pattern for celebrating a Conservative victory in the town. Levi James, returned in second place had briefly become a Liberal Unionist after supporting David Davies at the 1886 General Election, but had subsequently returned to the Liberal fold.

Cardigan Borough 1889
Party	Candidate	Votes	%	±%
Conservative	William Picton Evans	315		
Liberal	Levi James	296		
Liberal	Rev John Williams	282		
Conservative	David Griffith Davies	174		
Majority				

=== Cilcennin ===
Two Liberal candidates contested the seat and this draw criticism in the columns of Baner ac Amserau Cymru.

Cilcennin 1889
Party	Candidate	Votes	%	±%
Liberal	John Davies	116		
Liberal	John Jones	110		
Conservative	Major Price Lewes	88		
Majority		6		

=== Cwmrheidol ===
Cwmrheidol 1889
Party	Candidate	Votes	%	±%
Conservative	Capt. Nicholas Bray	87		
Liberal	John Morgan	58		
Majority		29		

=== Devil's Bridge ===
Devil's Bridge 1889
Party	Candidate	Votes	%	±%
Liberal	David Jones	106		
Conservative	T.J. Waddingham	87		
Majority		19		

=== Goginan ===
Goginan 1889
Party	Candidate	Votes	%	±%
Liberal	Rev David Morgan	Unopposed	N/A	N/A

=== Lampeter Borough ===
John Charles Harford of Falcondale defeated Abel Evans, a surgeon of Taliesin House.

Lampeter Borough 1889
Party	Candidate	Votes	%	±%
Conservative	John Charles Harford	180		
Liberal	Dr Abel Evans	166		
Majority		14		

=== Llanarth ===
Llanarth 1889
Party	Candidate	Votes	%	±%
Liberal	Morgan Evans	113		
Conservative	John Thomas	89		
Majority		24		

=== Llanbadarn Fawr ===
Llanbadarn Fawr
Party	Candidate	Votes	%	±%
Conservative	Dr John T. Morgan	125		
Liberal	Rev Llewellyn Edwards	116		
Majority		9		

=== Llanddewi Brefi ===
Llanddewi Brefi
Party	Candidate	Votes	%	±%
Liberal	David Davies	Unopposed		

=== Llandygwydd ===
Morgan Jones of Penylan, Llandygwydd, defeated David Lloyd, a surgeon, of Adpar, Newcastle Emlyn.

Llandygwydd 1889
Party	Candidate	Votes	%	±%
Unionist	Morgan Jones	95		
Liberal	David Lloyd	65		
Majority		30		

=== Llandyssul (two seats) ===
Llandysul
Party	Candidate	Votes	%	±%
Liberal	Rev T. Thomas	386		
Liberal	Enoch Davies	361		
Conservative	Charles Lloyd MA	223		
Majority				

=== Llansysiliogogo ===
Llansysiliogogo
Party	Candidate	Votes	%	±%
Liberal	Evan Evans	Unopposed	N/A	N/A

=== Llanfair Clydogau ===
Llanfair Clydogau
Party	Candidate	Votes	%	±%
Conservative	William Jones	139		
Liberal	John Watkin Davies	120		
Majority		19		

=== Llanfarian ===
Llanfarian
Party	Candidate	Votes	%	±%
Conservative	Morris Davies	87		
Conservative	Vaughan Davies	72		
Liberal	Lewis James	32		
Majority		15		

=== Llanfihangel y Creuddyn ===
Llanfihangel y Creuddyn
Party	Candidate	Votes	%	±%
Liberal	Evan Richards	193		
Conservative	Evan Evans	31		
Majority		162		

=== Llanfihangel Ystrad ===
Llanfihangel Ystrad
Party	Candidate	Votes	%	±%
Liberal	Daniel Jenkins	169		
Liberal	Jenkin Jenkins, Blaenplwyf	108		
Majority		61		

=== Llangoedmor ===
Llangoedmor
Party	Candidate	Votes	%	±%
Liberal	William Owen Brigstocke	Unopposed	N/A	N/A

=== Llangeitho ===
Llangeitho
Party	Candidate	Votes	%	±%
Liberal	W.H. Jones	83		
Unionist	R.J. Davies	75		
Liberal	John Rowlands	62		
Conservative	Evan Davies	28		
Majority		8		

=== Llangrannog ===
Llangrannog
Party	Candidate	Votes	%	±%
Liberal	John Davies	106		
Liberal Unionist	Henry Tobit Evans	47		
Majority		59		

=== Llanilar ===
Llanilar
Party	Candidate	Votes	%	±%
Conservative	G.T. Parry	118		
Liberal	Edward Edwards	114		
Majority		4		

=== Llanrhystyd ===
Llanrhystyd
Party	Candidate	Votes	%	±%
Liberal	James James	144		
Conservative	Major G.H.P. Hughes	126		
Majority		18		

=== Llanllwchaiarn and New Quay (two seats) ===
Llanllwchaiarn and New Quay (two seats)
Party	Candidate	Votes	%	±%
Liberal	William Davies	307		
Liberal	William Timothy	288		
Conservative	Charles Edward Longcroft	148		
Majority				

=== Llansantffraed ===
In a closely fought contest, the Conservative candidate won by a narrow margin over retired mariner, Daniel Jones. Surgeon Jenkin Lewis polled only 27 votes but would be more successful in future contests.

Llansantffraed 1889
Party	Candidate	Votes	%	±%
Conservative	E. Morgan	89		
Liberal	Capt. Daniel Jones	83		
Unionist	Jenkin Lewis	27		
Majority		6		

=== Llanwnen ===
Llanwnen
Party	Candidate	Votes	%	±%
Liberal	E.C.C. Davies	Unopposed	N/A	N/A

=== Llanwenog ===
The Lord Lieutenant of the County defeated a Unitarian minister, reflecting past conflicts over religious issues.

Llanwenog 1889
Party	Candidate	Votes	%	±%
Conservative	Col. H. Davies-Evans	174		
Liberal	Rev J. Davies	147		
Majority		27		

=== Lledrod ===
Lledrod
Party	Candidate	Votes	%	±%
Liberal	Rev John Owens	104		
Liberal	John Williams	88		
Conservative	Rev Evan Alban	71		
Majority		16		

=== Nantcwnlle ===
Nantcwnlle
Party	Candidate	Votes	%	±%
Liberal	Jenkin Jenkins (Aeronian)	150		
Liberal	David Davies, Pwllybadell	63		
	David Davies, Berthlwyd	27		
Majority		87		

=== Penbryn ===
David Griffiths of Penylan Fawr defeated Simon Davies of Aberarthen. Both candidates were farmers.

Penbryn 1889
Party	Candidate	Votes	%	±%
Liberal	David Griffiths	118		
Liberal	Simon Davies	105		
Majority		13		

=== Strata Florida ===
Strata Florida
Party	Candidate	Votes	%	±%
Conservative	Earl of Lisburne	Unopposed	N/A	N/A

=== Taliesin ===
Taliesin
Party	Candidate	Votes	%	±%
Liberal	John Morris	117		
Conservative	James Brittan	102		
Majority		15		

=== Talybont ===
Talybont
Party	Candidate	Votes	%	±%
Liberal	J.T. Morgan	Unopposed	N/A	N/A

=== Trefeurig ===
Trefeurig
Party	Candidate	Votes	%	±%
Liberal	Peter Jones	Unopposed	N/A	N/A

=== Tregaron ===
Tregaron
Party	Candidate	Votes	%	±%
Liberal	Roderick Lloyd	Unopposed	N/A	N/A

=== Troedyraur ===
Troedyraur
Party	Candidate	Votes	%	±%
Liberal	John Powell	179		
Conservative	Sir Marteine Lloyd	158		
Majority		21		

=== Ysbyty Ystwyth ===
Ysbyty Ystwyth
Party	Candidate	Votes	%	±%
Liberal	Thomas William Davies	97		
Conservative	William Davies	73		
Majority		24		

== Election of Aldermen ==
In addition to the 48 councillors the council consisted of 16 county aldermen. Aldermen were elected by the council, and served a six-year term. Following the election of the initial sixteen aldermen, half of the aldermanic bench would be elected every three years following the triennial council election. After the initial elections, there were sixteen Aldermanic vacancies and the following Alderman were appointed by the newly elected council:

Elected for six years

- C.M. Williams, Liberal (elected councillor at Aberystwyth)
- David Jenkins, Maesteg, Glandovey, Liberal (from outside the Council)
- Roderick Lloyd, Liberal (elected councillor at Tregaron)
- Levi James, Liberal (elected councillor at Cardigan)
- William Davies, Liberal (elected councillor at New Quay)
- J.T. Morgan, Liberal (elected councillor at Talybont)
- David Lloyd, Liberal (defeated candidate at Llandygwydd)
- David Davies, Maengwyn, Llanfair Orllwyn, Liberal (from outside the Council)

Elected for three years

- Earl Of Lisburne, Conservative (elected councillor at Strata Florida)
- Rev Llewellyn Edwards, Liberal (defeated candidate at Llanbadarn Fawr)
- Jenkin Jenkins (Aeronian), Liberal(elected councillor at Nantcwnlle)
- Daniel Jones, Liberal (defeated candidate at Llansantffraed)
- Rev John Davies, Liberal (defeated candidate at Llanwnen)
- William Jones, Conservative (elected councillor at Llanfair Clydogau)
- Major Price Lewes, Conservative (defeated candidate at Cilcennin)
- Jenkin Jenkins, Blaenplwyf, Liberal (defeated candidate at Ystrad Aeron)

The Liberals consented to their opponents receiving three of the sixteen aldermanic seats, roughly in proportion to their representation on the Council. Of the three Conservatives, Lord Lisburne and William Jones had been elected but Major Price Lewes of Tyglyn Aeron was bottom of the poll at Cilcennin, behind two Liberals. It was suggested that some Liberals had favoured the Lord Lieutenant, Herbert Davies-Evans and Charles Lloyd of Waunifor, defeated at Llandysul, but said to be a good financier, in place of Jones and Lewes, but had been over-ruled.

A number of elected Liberals councillors became aldermen, including Levi James of cardigan, a member of Cardigan Town Council for over twenty years; J.T. Morgan of Talybont; William Davies, Cross Inn, New Quay;

However the decision to choose eight of the new aldermen from outside of the Council soon tarnished the Liberal triumph. There had already been soundings in the local press in opposition to the move. ‘We profoundly regret the decision’ said a Cambrian News editorial, ‘to select outsiders as aldermen wherever that decision has been reached, and believe that a blow has been struck at the new bodies from which they will never recover until that decision is reversed.’ Particular objection was made to the election of aldermen of four candidates defeated at the polls. There were also two Liberal aldermen who did not even seek election.

== Aldermanic Vacancies 1889-1895 ==
Roderick Lloyd was appointed county surveyor and resigned his aldermanic seat. In May 1892, Rev John Owen was appointed to succeed him.

Therefore, the following appointment was made for the remaining three years in May 1892.

- Rev John Owen, Liberal (elected councillor for Lledrod)

== 1889 by-elections following election of aldermen ==
Eight by-elections were caused by the election of aldermen. In several cases local meetings were held to select a Liberal candidate and avoid a contest. At Talybont, for example, a test election was contested under the supervision of, amongst other, Alderman J.T. Morgan of Maesnewydd and William Morgan of neighbouring Bow Street. The Revd. John Davies defeated Richard Jones by 109 votes to 99 and Jones enthusiastically signed the successful candidate’s nomination papers. Two Liberal candidates unsuccessful at the first election, namely Rev John Williams in Cardigan and John Watkin Davies at Llanfair Clydogau, were elected unopposed.

The only contested elections were at Strata Florida, where a hotly contested poll led to the return of the rector of Ystrad Meurig for the seat vacates by the Earl of Lisburne and in neighbouring Tregaron, where the Conservatives captured the seat.

=== Aberystwyth by-election ===
Following the election of C.M. Williams as an alderman. D.C. Roberts, a member of a prominent Liberal family was returned unopposed.

Aberystwyth by-election 1889
Party	Candidate	Votes	%	±%
Liberal	D.C. Roberts	Unopposed	N/A	N/A

=== Cardigan Borough by-election ===
Following the election of Levi James as an alderman, the Rev John Williams, defeated at the initial election was returned unopposed.

Cardigan Borough by-election 1889
Party	Candidate	Votes	%	±%
Liberal	Rev John Williams	Unopposed	N/A	N/A

=== Llanfair Clydogau by-election ===
Following the election of William Jones, a Conservative, as an alderman, John Watkin Davies, the defeated Liberal candidate at the initial election was returned unopposed.

Llanfair Clydogau
Party	Candidate	Votes	%	±%
Liberal	John Watkin Davies	Unopposed	N/A	N/A

=== Llanllwchaiarn and New Quay by-election ===
Following the election of William Davies as an alderman, a test election took place at which draper John Owen Davies defeated farmer Joshua Jones of Nantypele. Davies was returned unopposed as a result.

Llanllwchaiarn and New Quay by-election 1889)
Party	Candidate	Votes	%	±%
Liberal	John Owen Davies	Unopposed	N/A	N/A

=== Nantcwnlle by-election ===
Nantcwnlle
Party	Candidate	Votes	%	±%
Liberal	William Jenkin Lloyd			
Liberal	John Jones			

=== Strata Florida by-election ===
Strata Florida by-election 1889
Party	Candidate	Votes	%	±%
Conservative	Rev John Jones	121		
Liberal	David Jenkins	110		

=== Talybont by-election ===
Following the election of J.T. Morgan as an alderman. a test election was held between the Rev John Davies and Richard Jones, grocer. Davies was successful and was returned unopposed, with his opponent signing his nomination papers.

Talybont by-election 1889
Party	Candidate	Votes	%	±%
Liberal	Rev John Davies	Unopposed	N/A	N/A

=== Tregaron by-election ===
Tregaron
Party	Candidate	Votes	%	±%
Conservative	E. Rowlands	173		
Liberal Unionist	D.J. Williams	133		

== Bibliography ==
- Morgan, Kenneth O. (1967). "Cardiganshire Politics: The Liberal Ascendancy 1885-1923". Ceredigion. 5 (4): 311–346.
- Palmer, Caroline (2004). "Matthew Lewis Vaughan Davies - ambitious cad or assiduous politician?". Ceredigion. 14 (4): 73–104.
