= List of chairmen of Cardiganshire County Council =

This is a list of the chairmen of Cardiganshire County Council.

== 1889–1914 ==
- 1889–1890: Peter Jones, Aberystwyth
- 1890–1891:
- 1891–1892: Levi James, Cardigan
- 1892–1893: Morgan Evans, Llanarth
- 1893–1894: D.C. Roberts, Aberystwyth
- 1894–1895: Rev. John Williams, Cardigan
- 1895–1896: John Morgan Howell, Aberaeron
- 1896–1897: C.M. Williams, Aberystwyth
- 1897–1898: Dr David Lloyd, Aberbanc, Newcastle Emlyn
- 1898–1899: John Charles Harford, Falcondale, Lampeter
- 1899–1900: Rev T. Mason Jones, Ysbyty Ystwyth
- 1900–1901: Matthew Vaughan-Davies MP
- 1901–1902: Colonel J.R. Howell
- 1902–1903: Dr Jenkyn Lewis, Llanon
- 1903–1904: Robert Ellis, Aberystwyth
- 1904–1905: Thomas Evans, Cefncourt, Llangrannog
- 1905–1906: D.J. Williams, Tregaron
- 1906–1907: E. Lima Jones, Aberaeron
- 1907–1908: H.C. Fryer, Aberystwyth
- 1908–1909: O. Beynon Evans, Cardigan
- 1909–1910: Rev William Griffiths, Maenygroes
- 1910–1911: R.S. Rowland, The Garth, Llanddewi
- 1911–1912:
- 1912–1913:
- 1913–1914:
