= Cardiganshire County Council =

Welsh local governing body (1889–1974)

Cardiganshire County Council was the local government authority for the county of Cardiganshire, Wales, between 1889 and 1974. It was superseded by Dyfed County Council.

== Overview ==
The administrative county of Cardigan and its local authority, the Cardiganshire County Council was established in 1889 under the Local Government Act 1888. The first elections were held in January 1889. The council was abolished under the Local Government Act 1972 on 1 April 1974. The Ceredigion District Council operated between 1974 and 1996 as a district within the new Dyfed County Council. As a result of the Local Government (Wales) Act 1994, which came into force on 1 April 1996, a new unitary authority of Cardiganshire was established with boundaries identical to those of the previous county council.

== Early history, 1889-1914 ==
During the period, Liberal candidates won large majorities at each election and Conservative support was limited to some of the towns and areas where local gentry continued to gain some personal support. The leadership of the council was composed mainly of prosperous middle class tradesmen, professionals and nonconformist ministers.

=== 1889 election ===
The first election was held in 1889 and the Liberal Party held a large majority of the seats down to the First World War, reflecting its dominance over the politics of the county.

The first meeting of the council was a notable watershed, as Morgan Evans of Oakford proposed that in fairness to the Welsh councillors business should be transacted in Welsh as well as in English. He proceeded to propose the Aberystwyth tradesmen Peter Jones, elected to represent rural Trefeurig as chair. The Earl of Lisburne seconded this proposal. Despite the fiery rhetoric at this initial election and at later contests, the Conservatives' willingness to accept the Liberal triumph was met in return with a tacit acceptance by the Liberals that the Conservatives be allocated a number of aldermanic seats. It was nearly ten years, however, before the council had a Conservative chairman: J.C. Harford of Falcondale, who was elected on a motion moved by Peter Jones.

By the early years of the twentieth century much of the earlier enthusiasm had become dissipated and many members attended only a few meetings a year.

== Offices ==
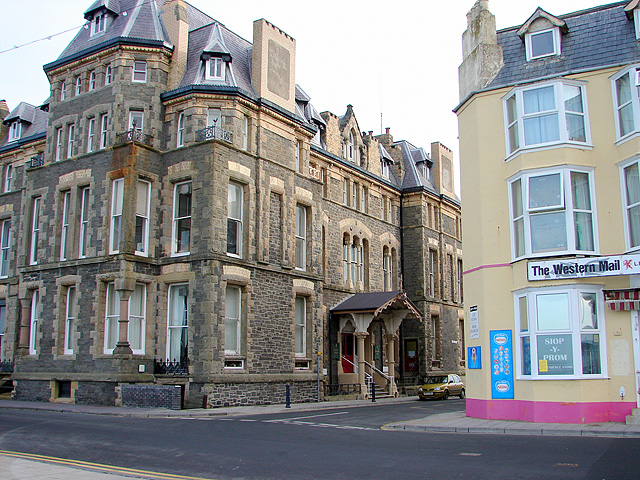
Swyddfa'r Sir in Aberystwyth

In the early years the county council held their meetings at Lampeter Town Hall. The county council established offices for county officials and their departments at the former town hall in Aberaeron in 1910 and it was not until 1950 that the council established a permanent base at Swyddfa'r Sir in Aberystwyth. Some departments, including the departments of the county surveyor and the county architect, remained at Aberaeron.

== See also ==
- List of Chairmen of Cardiganshire County Council
- 1889 Cardiganshire County Council election
- 1892 Cardiganshire County Council election
- 1895 Cardiganshire County Council election
- 1898 Cardiganshire County Council election
- 1901 Cardiganshire County Council election
- 1904 Cardiganshire County Council election
- 1907 Cardiganshire County Council election
- 1910 Cardiganshire County Council election
- 1913 Cardiganshire County Council election
- Ceredigion County Council, the post-1996 unitary authority.
