= The Aberystwyth Observer =

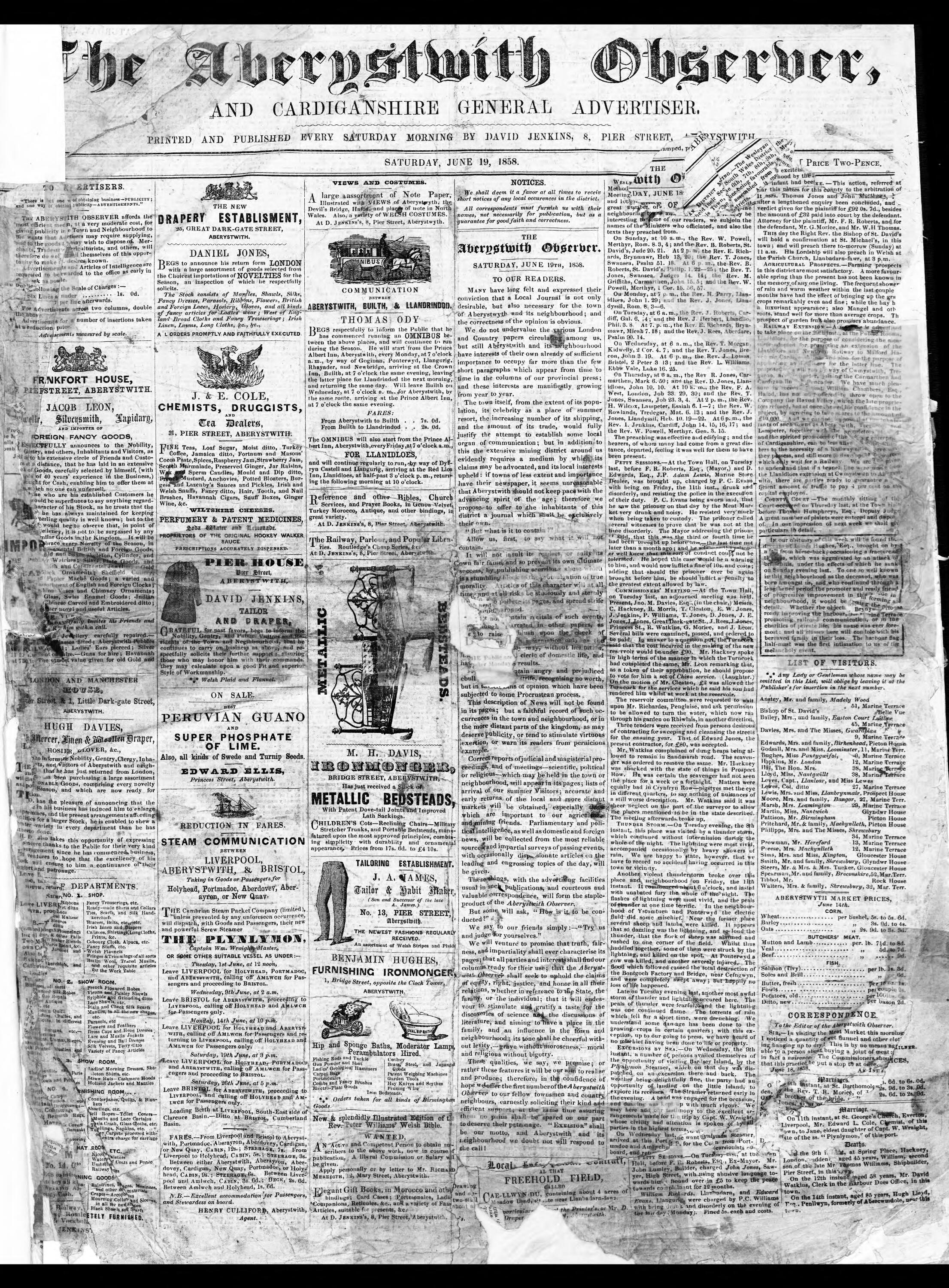
- The Aberystwith observer and Cardiganshire general advertiser
- Type: weekly newspaper
- Owner: David Jenkins (1857; 31 August 1872)
- Publisher: David Jenkins
- Editor: Richard Hughes Williams
- Launched: 19 June 1858
- City: Aberystwyth
- Country: Wales
- OCLC number: 751651280

The Aberystwyth Observer (established in 1858) was a weekly conservative English language newspaper in Wales.

The paper was distributed in Ceredigion, West Montgomeryshire, and South Merionethshire. It contained general and local news and information, and a list of visitors. It was published by David Jenkins.
