= Marteine Lloyd =

British baronet (1851–1933)

Sir Marteine Owen Mowbray Lloyd, 2nd Baronet
- Born: 8 February 1851
- Died: 4 April 1933
- Education: Eton College, private tutor
- Spouse: Katherine Helena (married 1878)
- Children: Marteine Arundel Keymes Lloyd, Nesta, Peverel and Joan
- Father: Sir Thomas Lloyd, 1st Baronet

Sir Marteine Owen Mowbray Lloyd, 2nd Baronet (8 February 1851–4 April 1933), was the second of the Lloyd Baronets of Bronwydd, Cardiganshire.

The son of Sir Thomas Lloyd, 1st Baronet, he was educated at Eton College and afterwards by a private tutor. He inherited the Bronwydd estate in 1877, at the age of twenty-six, on the death of his father. The total debt facing the young squire was £100,000, several million in today's terms. While Lloyd made good progress towards paying off these debts, he never entirely succeeded, and the death of his only son and heir, Marteine Arundel Keymes Lloyd at the Battle of the Somme in 1916, rendered the actions a moot point. He married, in 1878, Katherine Helena, daughter of Alexander Dennistoun of Golfhill, Glasgow. As well as a son, the couple had three daughters, Nesta, Peverel and Joan.

Lloyd served as a Justice of the Peace, Deputy Lieutenant of Cardiganshire and was appointed High Sheriff of the county for 1881. In addition, he served as a Master of Fox Hounds.

== Political career ==
He unsuccessfully contested the Parliamentary Constituency of East Carmarthenshire in 1885, even though he admitted that the constituency was not well known to him. This was seen as an action that had disastrous consequences for the reputation of the Lloyds.

== Local politics ==
Lloyd sought election, as Conservative candidate for the Troedyraur ward, to Cardiganshire County Council at the first elections in 1889 but was defeated by a local farmer, John Powell. In 1892 he narrowly won a by-election at New Quay and remained as a councillor in 1898. He was subsequently made an alderman and served for two terms between 1898 and 1910.

== Later life ==
The fortunes of the family declined after the war, because the Inland Revenue sought the payment of death duties. In an attempt at tax avoidance, Sir Marteine had transferred the estate to his son shortly before the latter's death on the Somme. The baronetage became extinct on Sir Marteine's death, and Lady Lloyd died in 1937.

Baronetage of the United Kingdom
Preceded by Thomas Lloyd	Baronet (of Bronwydd); 1877–1933	Extinct
