= Llanfihangel Ystrad =

Community in Ceredigion, Wales

Coordinates: 52°11′N 4°10′W

- Community
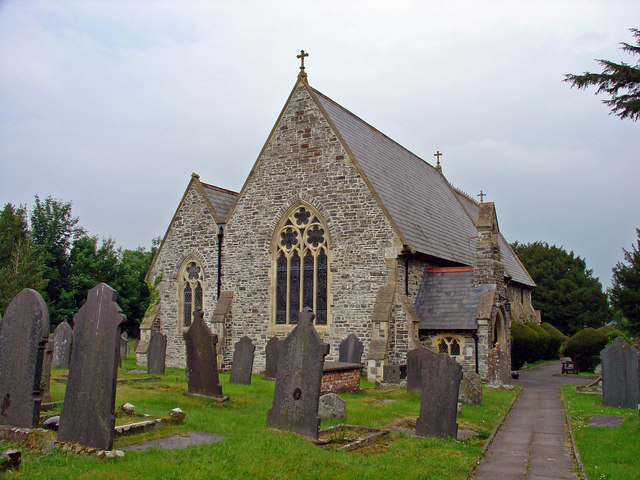
- St Michael's church

- Location within Ceredigion
- Principal area: Ceredigion
- Country: Wales
- Sovereign state: United Kingdom
- Police: Dyfed-Powys
- Fire: Mid and West Wales
- Ambulance: Welsh
- List of places UK Wales Ceredigion Community map: Map of the community

Llanfihangel Ystrad (Welsh for 'vale of St Michael') is a community and constituent parish in Ceredigion, Wales. It is named after the principal place of worship, St Michael's Church at Ystrad Aeron.

The total population of the community taken at the United Kingdom Census 2011 was 1,430.

Villages within the community include Ystrad Aeron, Felinfach, Dihewyd, Cribyn and Temple Bar.

== Governance ==
An electoral ward of the same name exists. This ward stretches to the community of Nantcwnlle with a total population of 2,037.

== Notable people ==
- Daniel Evans (1792–1846), a Welsh language poet; born at Maesymynach, a local farm.
