= Aberbanc =

Village in Ceredigion, Wales

Coordinates: 52°02′58″N 4°23′58″W

Aberbanc is a village in the Welsh county of Ceredigion.

Aber-banc is situated on a sharp bend on the A475 approximately 4 miles east of Newcastle Emlyn. Nant Gwylan and the River Cwerchyr join the River Cynllo here and there are a number of Tree Preservation Orders along the north eastern bank of the River Cynllo. The historic core of the settlement consists of distinctive, stone-built individual and terraced properties. More recent development forms an elongated cluster on the hill rising westwards out of the valley along the A475. The settlement comprises over 25 dwellings. The Methodist Chapel is a listed building.

In 1848, a co-educational national school was built, which had an average attendance of 68 in 1904. The settlement has a primary school which serves adjacent communities at Penrhiw-llan and Henllan. The school was closed in 2016 due to opening of new super school in Llandysul. The Welsh language is in everyday use. Aber-banc relies for both everyday and major facilities on Newcastle Emlyn, and lies on a bus route serviced on Tuesday only between Llandysul and Newcastle Emlyn.
