= John Morgan Howell =

British politician (1855–1928)

John Morgan Howell (1855-1928) was a prominent figure in the public life of Cardiganshire in the late nineteenth and early twentieth centuries. A supporter of the Liberal Party, he represented Aberaeron as a county councillor for over thirty years and served on many other public bodies.

Shortly after he was elected as county councillor in 1889, Howell married Ann Evans at the Tabernacle Calvinistic Methodist Church, Aberaeron. Howell was a prominent figure at Tabernacle, became its precentor in 1874, and was also superintendent of the Sunday school from a young age. It was said that he was the mainstay of the musical festivals or Cymanfaoedd held in the district.

Howell was a prominent businessman and operated a flourishing ironmongery business at Portland House, Aberaeron. He served as a director of the Lampeter and Aberayron Railway which opened in 1911. In many ways, he represented the urban, commercial, middle class, who became a powerful new force within society in Cardiganshire during the 1880s.

J.M. Howell was associated with the radical wing of the Liberal Party in Cardiganshire and a keen supporter of policies such as land reform and disestablishment. His submission to the 1894 Enquiry into the Land Question in Wales reflects his outlook. 'There is a spirit of vassalage among the tillers of the soil', according to his evidence, 'begotten by the tyranny of the past. The shadows of the oppression and evictions of 1868 have not lifted from among the people'. This was a reference to the general election of 1868 in Wales, which had been characterised by allegations of coercion by landowners at what proved to be the last election before the introduction of the ballot. However, recent historians have questioned the traditional version and claimed that there were also examples of coercion by nonconformist ministers.

Elected to the Cardiganshire County Council at the first elections in 1889, Howell became chairman of the Council in 1895-6 and was made an alderman in 1898.

Having served as a county councillor for thirty years, the veteran Howell became embroiled in the infighting within the Liberal Association between supporters of Lloyd George and Asquith after the First World War. He presided at a meeting addressed by Asquith at Aberystwyth in 1919 and was invited to stand as an Asquithian Liberal candidate in 1921 when Lloyd George engineered a peerage for Vaughan Davies to allow his supporter Ernest Evans to contest the seat. Howell, however, refused, and announced that he supported Lloyd George.

He regularly wrote articles for their Welsh language press on political and literary subjects and was also a keen amateur poet.

== Bibliography ==
- Morgan, Kenneth O. (1967). "Cardiganshire Politics: The Liberal Ascendancy 1885-1923". Ceredigion. 5 (4): 311–346.
