= Cilcennin =

Village in Ceredigion, Wales

Coordinates: 52.22°N 4.17°W

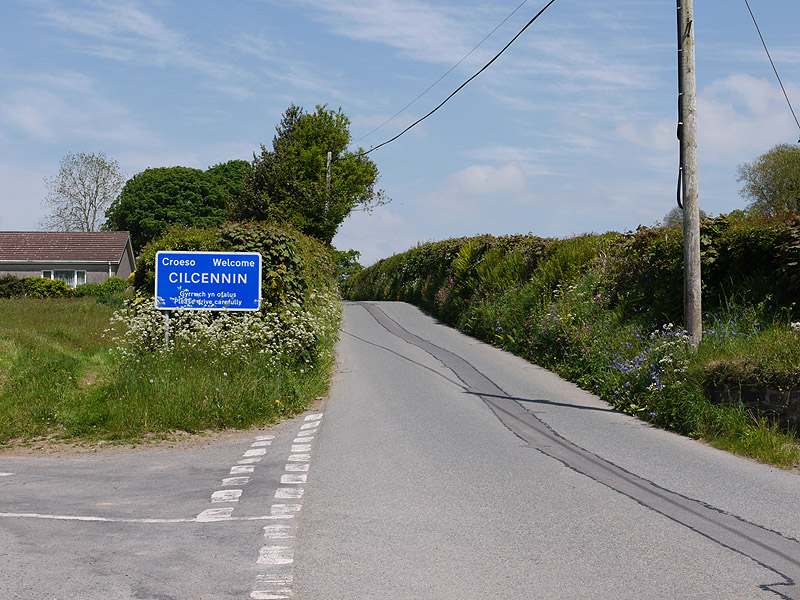
- Western approach to Cilcennin

- Location within Ceredigion
- OS grid reference: SN522602
- Principal area: Ceredigion
- Preserved county: Dyfed
- Country: Wales
- Sovereign state: United Kingdom
- Postcode district: SA48
- Dialling code: 01570
- Police: Dyfed-Powys
- Fire: Mid and West Wales
- Ambulance: Welsh
- UK Parliament: Ceredigion Preseli
- Senedd Cymru – Welsh Parliament: Ceredigion Penfro

Cilcennin is a village in the community of Ciliau Aeron, Ceredigion, west Wales. The River Aeron is to the southwest.

== History ==
Cilcennin is the site of a historic slaughter in 1210, when Owain Goch ap Gruffydd and three hundred men attacked and killed soldiers from a superior English and Welsh troops' body under the command of their uncle Maelgwn ap Rhys.

The church in Cilcennin is dedicated to St. Cannen, and was rebuilt in the 19th century through public contributions.

== Gallery ==
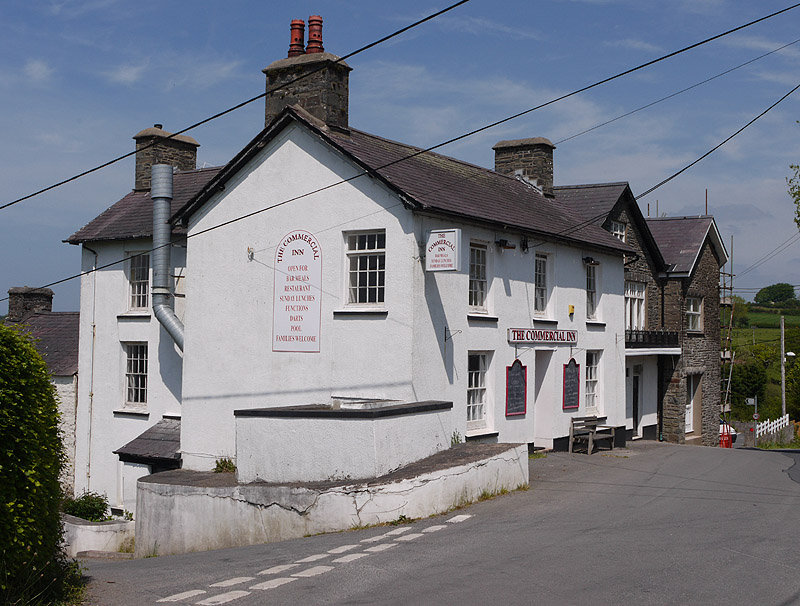
Tafarn Commercial Inn, Cilcennin

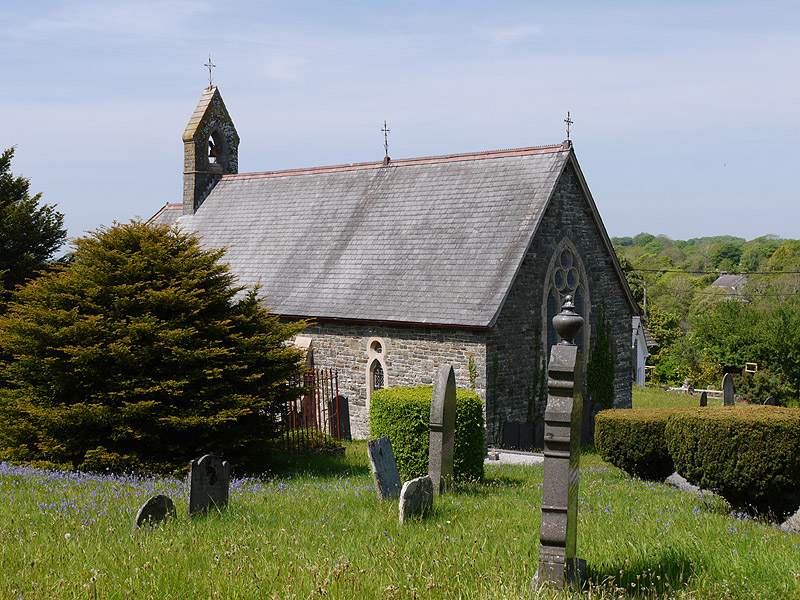
Cilcennin church

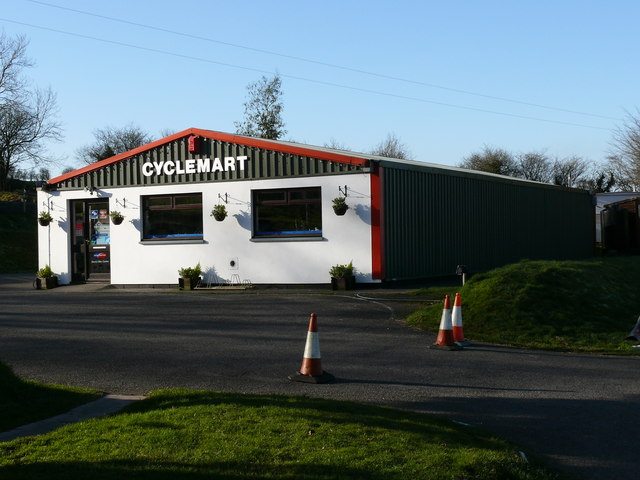
Cycle shop near Cilcennon
