= Goginan =

Village in Ceredigion, Wales

Coordinates: 52.412°N 3.930°W

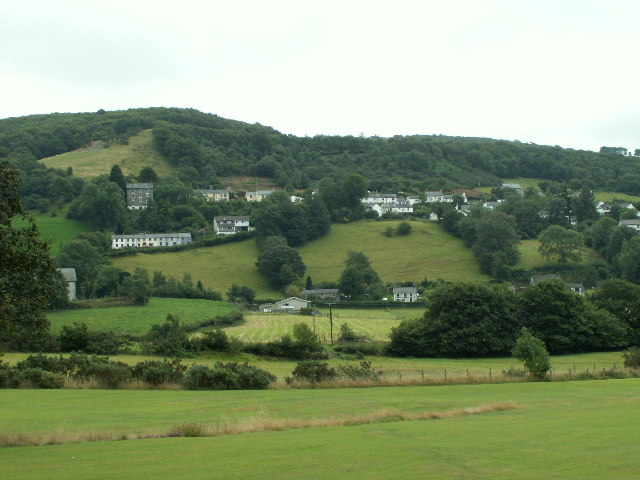
Goginan.

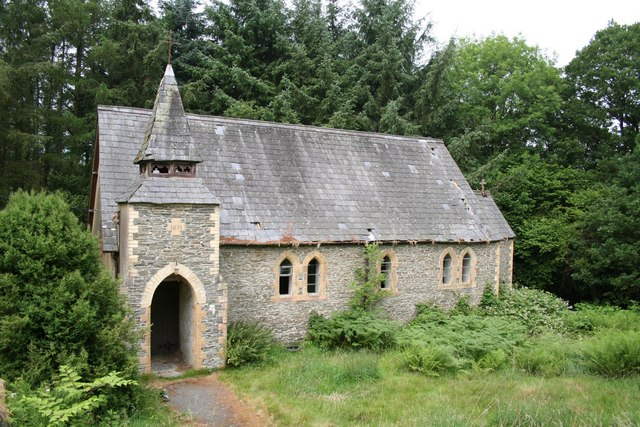
Goginan Church.

Goginan is a small village in Ceredigion, Wales, about 7 miles outside Aberystwyth on the A44 between Ponterwyd and Capel Bangor. Afon Melindwr runs through the village, and is a tributary of the Afon Rheidol.

The village originally grew around farms in the area, but increased with the development of local mines.

To the east of the villages lies a Grade II Listed 19th century house thought to be associated with the lead mines in the area; it is probably the Goginan mine manager's house. Cadw Building ID: 9857.

== Famous people from the village ==
- William Ambrose Bebb. Author
- Humphrey Owen Jones
- Owen Prys
