= Nantcwnlle =

Community in Ceredigion, Wales

- Location within Ceredigion
- Population: 804 (2011)
- Principal area: Ceredigion
- Preserved county: Dyfed
- Country: Wales
- Sovereign state: United Kingdom
- Post town: Lampeter
- Postcode district: SA48 8
- Police: Dyfed-Powys
- Fire: Mid and West Wales
- Ambulance: Welsh
- UK Parliament: Ceredigion Preseli
- Senedd Cymru – Welsh Parliament: Ceredigion Penfro
- List of places UK Wales Ceredigion 52.211814°N 4.087311°W Community map: Map of the community

Nantcwnlle is a community in Ceredigion, Wales, including the villages of Penuwch, Bwlchllan, Talsarn and Llwyngroes.

== Notable people ==
- David Edwards (minister) (1660-1716), landlord in Nantcwnlle
- Daniel Rowland (1713–1790), was born in Nantcwnlle; he was one of the leading evangelists in Wales.
