= 1922 Cardiganshire County Council election =

1922 Welsh local election

The eleventh election to Cardiganshire County Council took place in March 1922. It was preceded by the 1919 election and followed by the 1925 election.

== Boundary changes ==
A revision of the ward boundaries in Aberystwyth resulted in the creation of six wards instead of four, thus increasing the number of elected councillors from 48 to 50. The number of aldermen remained unchanged at 16.

== Candidates ==
When the nominations eventually closed there were contests in 24 of the 26 divisions. The early 1920s saw a deep division in Liberal ranks in Cardiganshire, and this was reflected in the large number of contested elections, including contests between rival Liberal factions. However, neither of the two rival Liberal Associations, or the Conservative Association, took an active role in the election, and the Labour Party did not field any candidates.

In many communities, meetings of electors were held prior to the election, and some of these led to the nominated candidate being returned unopposed. An interesting case arose at Bow Street, where a meeting expressed dissatisfaction with Sir Lewes Loveden Price of Gogerddan, who was said to have only attended two council meetings in two years.

== Retiring aldermen ==
Seven aldermen retired, all of whom had been elected as Liberals, and there was also a vacancy following the death of James Stephens (Llechryd). Two of their number, John Morgan Howell (Aberaeron) and Rev T. Arthur Thomas (Llandysul) contested the election. The other retiring aldermen were J.W. Davies (Llangybi), Peter Jones (Aberystwyth), C.M. Williams (Aberystwyth), J.T. Morgan (Llandre) and Thomas Morgan (Ysbyty Ystwyth). Aldermen Howell, Jones, J.T. Morgan and Williams had served as members of the council since its formation but the latter three had not faced the electorate for many years.

== Contested elections ==
Most of the 24 contests were said to have been "strenuous and exciting". It was stated that the bitterest fights were between candidates of the same political persuasion.

Relatively few of the retiring members were defeated, although a prominent casualty was John Humphreys Davies, principal of the University College at Aberystywth, who was defeated at Llangeitho by a Coalition Liberal

== Outcome ==
The deep schism in the Liberal ranks, as a result of two Liberal factions fighting each other at the Cardiganshire parliamentary by-election the previous year, was reflected in many of the local contests at the election. In contrast, however, many of the contests were personal ones, and in some cases the political labels were irrelevant, especially where candidates of the same political persuasion fought each other. The number of contest fought on traditional Liberal versus Conservative lines was small and many of those members returned unopposed did not declare their political allegiance. In reality, therefore, the 1922 elections inaugurated a new era in Cardiganshire politics where the vast majority of councillors would be elected as Independents. Of the 24 elected members, x were Coalition (or National) Liberals, y were Independent (or Asquithian) Liberals while z were Conservatives.

== Division results ==
=== Aberaeron ===
Aberaeron 1922
Party	Candidate	Votes	%	±%
Conservative	Dr David Morgan Davies*	Unopposed		
Conservative hold		Swing		

=== Aberbanc ===
Aberbanc 1922
Party	Candidate	Votes	%	±%
Liberal	Rev Evan James Davies	Unopposed		
Liberal hold		Swing		

=== Aberporth ===
Aberporth 1922
Party	Candidate	Votes	%	±%
National Liberal	Samuel Griffiths Davies	225		
National Liberal	Thomas Evans	117		
Majority		108		
National Liberal gain from Conservative		Swing		

=== Aberystwyth Division 1 ===
Aberystwyth Division 1 1922
Party	Candidate	Votes	%	±%
Independent Liberal	William Edwards	197		
Conservative	Walter Diver	133		
Majority		64		
Independent Liberal win (new seat)				

=== Aberystwyth Division 2 ===
Aberystwyth Division 2 1922
Party	Candidate	Votes	%	±%
Conservative	R.J. Jones	271		
Independent Liberal	Miss M.E. Marles-Thomas	135		
Majority		136		
Conservative win (new seat)				

=== Aberystwyth Division 3 ===
Aberystwyth Division 3 1922
Party	Candidate	Votes	%	±%
Independent	J. Barclay Jenkins	Unopposed		
Independent win (new seat)				

=== Aberystwyth Division 4 ===
Aberystwyth Division 4 1922
Party	Candidate	Votes	%	±%
Liberal	T.J. Samuel*	Unopposed		
Liberal win (new seat)				

=== Aberystwyth Division 5 ===
Aberystwyth Division 5 1922
Party	Candidate	Votes	%	±%
Liberal	John Evans*	Unopposed		
Liberal win (new seat)				

=== Aberystwyth Division 6 ===
Aberystwyth Division 6 1922
Party	Candidate	Votes	%	±%
Independent Liberal	Llewellyn Samuel	150		
National Liberal	T.H. Edwards	149		
Majority		1		
Independent Liberal win (new seat)				

=== Aeron ===
}

Aeron 1922
Party	Candidate	Votes	%	±%
Independent Liberal	John Morgan Howell**	251		
Conservative	Thomas Jenkins	211		
Majority		40		
Independent Liberal hold		Swing		

=== Borth ===
Borth 1922
Party	Candidate	Votes	%	±%
Liberal	R.E. Jones	Unopposed		
Liberal hold		Swing		

=== Bow Street ===
Bow Street 1922
Party	Candidate	Votes	%	±%
Independent Liberal	David Rees Morgan*	158		
National Liberal	D.W. Thomas	83		
Majority		75		
Independent Liberal hold		Swing		

=== Cardigan North ===
Cardigan North 1922
Party	Candidate	Votes	%	±%
Independent Liberal	William Edward Matthews*	463		
National Liberal	David Davies	227		
Majority		163		
Independent Liberal hold		Swing		

=== Cardigan South ===
Cardigan South 1922
Party	Candidate	Votes	%	±%
Conservative	John Evans	Unopposed		
Conservative hold		Swing		

=== Cilcennin ===
Cilcennin 1922
Party	Candidate	Votes	%	±%
Independent Liberal	John Jones*	223		
National Liberal	Evan Felix	191		
Majority		32		
Independent Liberal hold		Swing		

=== Cwmrheidol ===
Cwmrheidol 1922
Party	Candidate	Votes	%	±%
Independent Liberal	John Morgan*	110		
Independent Liberal	Ll.J. Lewis	98		
Majority		32		
Independent Liberal hold		Swing		

=== Devil's Bridge ===
Devil's Bridge 1922
Party	Candidate	Votes	%	±%
Conservative	J.G. Morris Davies*	Unopposed		
Conservative hold		Swing		

=== Felinfach ===
Felinfach 1922
Party	Candidate	Votes	%	±%
Liberal	Simon Davies	Unopposed		
Liberal hold		Swing		

=== Goginan ===
Goginan 1922
Party	Candidate	Votes	%	±%
Liberal	William Griffiths*	Unopposed		
Liberal hold		Swing		

=== Lampeter Borough ===
Lampeter Borough 1922
Party	Candidate	Votes	%	±%
Conservative	J.C. Harford*	Unopposed		
Conservative hold		Swing		

=== Llanarth ===
Llanarth 1922
Party	Candidate	Votes	%	±%
Liberal	Evan Lloyd*	Unopposed		
Liberal hold		Swing		

=== Llanbadarn Fawr ===
Llanbadarn Fawr 1922
Party	Candidate	Votes	%	±%
Conservative	Henry Bonsall*	Unopposed		
Conservative hold		Swing		

=== Llanddewi Brefi ===
Llanddewi Brefi 1922
Party	Candidate	Votes	%	±%
Independent Liberal	Peter Davies	237		
Conservative	Rev T.R. Davies	220		
Majority		34		
Independent Liberal gain from Conservative		Swing		

=== Llandygwydd ===
Llandygwydd 1922
Party	Candidate	Votes	%	±%
National Liberal	David James	319		
National Liberal	Capt. David Davies	249		
Majority		70		
National Liberal hold		Swing		

=== Llandysul North ===
Llandysul North 1922
Party	Candidate	Votes	%	±%
Independent Liberal	Josiah Richard Jones*	257		
Liberal	Evan J. Lewis	165		
Majority		92		
Independent Liberal hold		Swing		

=== Llandysul South ===
Llandysul South 1922
Party	Candidate	Votes	%	±%
Independent Liberal	Rev Thomas Arthur Thomas**	340		
Conservative	William Jones	288		
Majority		52		
Independent Liberal hold		Swing		

=== Llansysiliogogo ===
Llandysiliogogo 1922
Party	Candidate	Votes	%	±%
Independent Liberal	James Elias Jones	202		
Independent Liberal	Rees Williams	188		
Majority		14		
Independent Liberal hold		Swing		

=== Llanfair Clydogau ===
Llanfair Clydogau 1922
Party	Candidate	Votes	%	±%
Conservative	Tom Davies	239		
Liberal	D. Lloyd Lewis*	205		
Majority		34		
Conservative gain from Liberal		Swing		

=== Llanfarian ===
Llanfarian 1922
Party	Candidate	Votes	%	±%
Liberal	Richard Jones	Unopposed		
Liberal gain from Conservative		Swing		

=== Llanfihangel y Creuddyn ===
Llanfihangel y Creuddyn 1922
Party	Candidate	Votes	%	±%
Independent Liberal	Thomas Evans Joel	240		
Conservative	Percy Wilkinson*	138		
Majority		102		
Independent Liberal gain from Conservative		Swing		

=== Llangoedmor ===
Llangoedmor 1922
Party	Candidate	Votes	%	±%
Conservative	Richard Evans*	Unopposed		
Conservative hold		Swing		

=== Llangeitho ===
Llangeitho 1922
Party	Candidate	Votes	%	±%
Independent Liberal	Dr David Davies	296		
Liberal	John Humphreys Davies*	163		
Majority		133		
Independent Liberal gain from Liberal		Swing		

=== Llangrannog ===
Llangrannog 1922
Party	Candidate	Votes	%	±%
Independent Liberal	Samuel Jones*	179		
National Liberal	David Rees	138		
Majority		41		
Independent Liberal hold		Swing		

=== Llanilar ===
Llanilar 1922
Party	Candidate	Votes	%	±%
Liberal	Isaac Jones*	Unopposed		
Liberal hold		Swing		

=== Llanrhystyd ===
Llanrhystyd 1922
Party	Candidate	Votes	%	±%
Independent Liberal	D. Morgan James	216		
National Liberal	Evan Evans	179		
Majority		37		
Independent Liberal gain from Independent		Swing		

=== Llanllwchaiarn ===
Llanllwchaiarn 1922
Party	Candidate	Votes	%	±%
Liberal	Evan Lewis*	Unopposed		
Liberal hold		Swing		

=== Llansantffraed ===
Llansantffraed 1922
Party	Candidate	Votes	%	±%
Independent Liberal	Evan Morris Jones*	244		
National Liberal	Capt. William Davies	140		
Majority		104		
Independent Liberal hold		Swing		

=== Llanwnen ===
Llanwnen 1922
Party	Candidate	Votes	%	±%
National Liberal	Dr Evan Evans	169		
Liberal	John Jones*	135		
Majority		34		
National Liberal gain from Liberal		Swing		

=== Llanwenog ===
Llanwenog 1922
Party	Candidate	Votes	%	±%
Liberal	Meredith Ll. Gwarnant Williams*	328		
Liberal	Dr Evan Jones	243		
Liberal hold		Swing		

=== Lledrod ===
Lledrod 1922
Party	Candidate	Votes	%	±%
Liberal	Richard Daniel Herbert*	Unopposed		
Liberal hold		Swing		

=== Nantcwnlle ===
Nantcwnlle 1922
Party	Candidate	Votes	%	±%
Liberal	Daniel Lewis Herbert*	Unopposed		
Liberal hold		Swing		

=== New Quay ===
New Quay 1922
Party	Candidate	Votes	%	±%
Liberal	Evan James Davies*	Unopposed		
Liberal hold		Swing		

=== Penbryn ===
Penbryn 1922
Party	Candidate	Votes	%	±%
Liberal	John William Lewis*	Unopposed		
Liberal hold		Swing		

=== Strata Florida ===
Strata Florida 1922
Party	Candidate	Votes	%	±%
Conservative	Dr John Morgan	Unopposed		
Conservative hold		Swing		

=== Taliesin ===
Taliesin 1922
Party	Candidate	Votes	%	±%
Conservative	Dr John James*	Unopposed		
Conservative hold		Swing		

=== Talybont ===
Talybont 1922
Party	Candidate	Votes	%	±%
Liberal	Jenkin Evan Evans*	Unopposed		
Liberal hold		Swing		

=== Trefeurig ===
Trefeurig 1922
Party	Candidate	Votes	%	±%
Liberal	Richard Evans*	Unopposed		
Liberal hold		Swing		

=== Tregaron ===
Tregaron 1922
Party	Candidate	Votes	%	±%
Liberal	D. J. Williams*	Unopposed		
Liberal hold		Swing		

=== Troedyraur ===
Troedyraur 1922
Party	Candidate	Votes	%	±%
Independent Liberal	David Evans*	537		
National Liberal	M. Enoch Thomas	155		
Majority		382		
Independent Liberal hold		Swing		

=== Ysbyty Ystwyth ===
Ysbyty Ystwyth 1922
Party	Candidate	Votes	%	±%
Conservative	R.R. Nancarrow	124		
Liberal	Morgan Lloyd Williams	121		
Majority		3		
Conservative hold		Swing		

== Election of Aldermen ==
Eight aldermen were elected, including three long-serving members (Peter Jones, J.T. Morgan and C.M. Williams) who had not faced the electorate for many years and five new aldermen, all of whom had been elected at the recent election. D.J. Williams of Tregaron had previously served as an alderman from 1901 until 1907. The two retiring aldermen who had sought election (John Morgan Howell and the Rev T. Arthur Thomas) were not among those appointed for the next six years.

There was some press criticism, notably in the Welsh Gazette, of the Liberal 'caucus', said to be controlled by John Morgan Howell and D.C. Roberts, the veteran member who was elected to the chair for 1922/23, and especially the practice of electing aldermen who had not contested the election.

- C. M. Williams, Aberystwyth, 42
- Peter Jones, Aberystwyth, 42
- J. T. Morgan Talybont, 42
- Meredith Gwarnant Williams, Llanwenog, 41
- Josiah T. Jones, Llandyssul, 41
- D. J. Williams, Tregaron. 42
- John Jones, Cilcennin, 42
- Richard Evans, Llangoedmor, 41

== By-elections ==
Five by-elections were held following the election of aldermen. At Tregaron, Mary Lloyd became the first woman elected to Cardiganshire County Council when she was returned unopposed. Dr Evan Jones, who had unsuccessfully stood against Meredith Gwarnant Williams at Llanwenog, was returned unopposed at the by-election. Three wards were contested but no party allegiances were declared (although the political allegiances of two of the successful candidates were noted at the 1928 election.

=== Cilcennin by-election ===
Cilcennin by-election 1922
Party	Candidate	Votes	%	±%
Independent	Evan Felix	258		
Independent	Jenkin Williams	196		
Majority		62		
Independent gain from Liberal		Swing		

=== Llandysul North by-election ===
Llandysul North by-election 1922
Party	Candidate	Votes	%	±%
Liberal	Rev Evan Oliver Jenkins	238		
Independent	William Davies	224		
Majority		14		
Liberal hold		Swing		

=== Llangoedmor by-election ===
Llangoedmor by-election 1922
Party	Candidate	Votes	%	±%
Liberal	Evan Davies	464		
Independent	Rev. Evan Lewis	204		
Majority		260		
Independent gain from Conservative		Swing		

=== Llanwenog by-election ===
Llanwenog by-election 1922
Party	Candidate	Votes	%	±%
Independent	Dr Evan Jones	Unopposed		
Independent gain from Liberal		Swing		

=== Tregaron by-election ===
Tregaron by-election 1922
Party	Candidate	Votes	%	±%
Liberal	Mary Lloyd	Unopposed		
Liberal hold		Swing		

== Sources ==
- Morgan, Kenneth O. (1967). "Cardiganshire Politics: The Liberal Ascendancy 1885–1923" (PDF). Ceredigion. 5 (4): 311–346.
