= 1931 Cardiganshire County Council election =

1931 Welsh local election

The fourteenth election to Cardiganshire County Council took place in March 1931. It was preceded by the 1928 election and followed by the 1934 election.

== Candidates ==
32 of the 50 councillors were returned unopposed with a further three seats being won unopposed by new candidates. This resulted in fifteen contests, five more than three years previously Political affiliations did not feature in the election.

Among the retiring members, Henry Bonsall stood down at Llanbadarn Fawr. He first represented Bow Street from 1892 until 1904 and subsequently serving as member for Llanbadarn for nearly twenty years.

== Retiring aldermen ==
Eight aldermen retired, but only Meredith Gwarnant Williams (Llanwenog) stood as a candidate in the election.

== Gains and losses ==
Very few seats changed hands.

== Contested elections ==
Of the fifteen contests, ten featured retiring members, eight of whom were successful. Seats were largely not fought on political lines.

== Outcome ==
Very little change took place as a result of an election in which only one sitting member lost his seat.

== Division results ==
=== Aberaeron ===
Aberaeron 1931
Party	Candidate	Votes	%	±%
Independent	Dr David Morgan Davies*	Unopposed		
Independent hold		Swing		

=== Aberbanc ===
Aberbanc 1931
Party	Candidate	Votes	%	±%
Independent	Rev Evan James Davies*	Unopposed		
Independent hold		Swing		

=== Aberporth ===
Aberporth 1931
Party	Candidate	Votes	%	±%
Independent	Samuel Griffiths Davies*	Unopposed		
Independent hold		Swing		

=== Aberystwyth Division 1 ===
Aberystwyth Division 1 1931
Party	Candidate	Votes	%	±%
Independent	William Edwards*	Unopposed		
Independent hold		Swing		

=== Aberystwyth Division 2 ===
Aberystwyth Division 2 1931
Party	Candidate	Votes	%	±%
Independent	Capt. B. Taylor Lloyd	358		
Independent	Mrs E.K. Jones*	144		
Majority		214		
Independent hold		Swing		

=== Aberystwyth Division 3 ===
Aberystwyth Division 3 1931
Party	Candidate	Votes	%	±%
Independent	J. Barclay Jenkins*	Unopposed		
Independent hold		Swing		

=== Aberystwyth Division 4 ===
Aberystwyth Division 4 1931
Party	Candidate	Votes	%	±%
Independent	T.C. Jenkins*	Unopposed		
Independent hold		Swing		

=== Aberystwyth Division 5 ===
Aberystwyth Division 5 1931
Party	Candidate	Votes	%	±%
Independent	Mrs M.E. Roberts*	Unopposed		
Independent hold		Swing		

=== Aberystwyth Division 6 ===
Aberystwyth Division 6 1931
Party	Candidate	Votes	%	±%
Independent	Llewellyn Samuel*	Unopposed		
Independent hold		Swing		

=== Aeron ===
Aeron 1931
Party	Candidate	Votes	%	±%
Independent	Evan Thomas Davies*	Unopposed		
Independent hold		Swing		

=== Borth ===
Borth 1931
Party	Candidate	Votes	%	±%
Independent	William Jones*	291		
Independent	H. Lloyd Roberts	220		
Majority		71		
Independent hold		Swing		

=== Bow Street ===
Bow Street 1931
Party	Candidate	Votes	%	±%
Independent	Edward James	Unopposed		
Independent hold		Swing		

=== Cardigan North ===
Cardigan North 1931
Party	Candidate	Votes	%	±%
Independent	Hubert Maxwell Davies	Unopposed		
Independent hold		Swing		

=== Cardigan South ===
Cardigan South 1931
Party	Candidate	Votes	%	±%
Independent	John Evans*	Unopposed		
Independent hold		Swing		

=== Cilcennin ===
Cilcennin 1931
Party	Candidate	Votes	%	±%
Independent	Evan Evans*	Unopposed		
Independent hold		Swing		

=== Cwmrheidol ===
Cwmrheidol 1931
Party	Candidate	Votes	%	±%
Independent	John Morgan*	Unopposed		
Independent hold		Swing		

=== Devil's Bridge ===
Devil's Bridge 1931
Party	Candidate	Votes	%	±%
Independent	Mrs D.H. Morris Davies*	Unopposed		
Independent hold		Swing		

=== Felinfach ===
Felinfach 1931
Party	Candidate	Votes	%	±%
Independent	Mrs Gladys M. Davies	262		
Independent	E. James	228		
Majority		214		
Independent hold		Swing		

=== Goginan ===
Goginan 1931
Party	Candidate	Votes	%	±%
Independent	William Thomas	Unopposed		
Independent hold		Swing		

=== Lampeter Borough ===
Lampeter Borough 1931
Party	Candidate	Votes	%	±%
Independent	Walter Davies*	Unopposed		
Independent hold		Swing		

=== Llanarth ===
Llanarth 1931
Party	Candidate	Votes	%	±%
Independent	William Mabon Rees	251		
Independent	D. Christmas Evans	200		
Majority		51		
Independent hold		Swing		

=== Llanbadarn Fawr ===
Llanbadarn Fawr 1931
Party	Candidate	Votes	%	±%
Independent	Emile Thomas Evans	Unopposed		
Independent hold		Swing		

=== Llanddewi Brefi ===
Llanddewi Brefi 1931
Party	Candidate	Votes	%	±%
Independent	Rev John Ellis Williams*	Unopposed		
Independent hold		Swing		

=== Llandygwydd ===
Llandygwydd 1931
Party	Candidate	Votes	%	±%
Independent	David James*	Unopposed		
Independent hold		Swing		

=== Llandysul North ===
Llandysul North 1931
Party	Candidate	Votes	%	±%
Independent	Rev. Evan Oliver Jenkins*	249		
Independent	Griffith T. Davies	248		
Majority		1		
Independent hold		Swing		

=== Llandysul South ===
Llandysul South 1931
Party	Candidate	Votes	%	±%
Independent	Rev Thomas Arthur Thomas*	553		
Independent	William Evans	286		
Majority		267		
Independent hold		Swing		

=== Llansysiliogogo ===
Llandysiliogogo 1931
Party	Candidate	Votes	%	±%
Independent	James Elias Jones*	Unopposed		
Independent hold		Swing		

=== Llanfair Clydogau ===
Llanfair Clydogau 1931
Party	Candidate	Votes	%	±%
Independent	Daniel James	Unopposed		
Independent hold		Swing		

=== Llanfarian ===
Llanfarian 1931
Party	Candidate	Votes	%	±%
Independent	Richard Jones*	Unopposed		
Independent hold		Swing		

=== Llanfihangel y Creuddyn ===
Llanfihangel y Creuddyn 1931
Party	Candidate	Votes	%	±%
Independent	Thomas Evans Joel*	211		
Independent	J. Morgan Williams	195		
Majority		16		
Independent hold		Swing		

=== Llangoedmor ===
Llangoedmor 1931
Party	Candidate	Votes	%	±%
Independent	Evan Davies*	Unopposed		
Independent hold		Swing		

=== Llangeitho ===
Llangeitho 1931
Party	Candidate	Votes	%	±%
Independent	Edward Jones	286		
Independent	T. Walter Davies	150		
Majority		136		
Independent hold		Swing		

=== Llangrannog ===
Llangrannog 1931
Party	Candidate	Votes	%	±%
Independent	John Williams*	Unopposed		
Independent hold		Swing		

=== Llanilar ===
Llanilar 1931
Party	Candidate	Votes	%	±%
Independent	R.J.R. Loxdale**	Unopposed		
Independent hold		Swing		

=== Llanrhystyd ===
Llanrhystyd 1931
Party	Candidate	Votes	%	±%
Independent	R. Hugh Jones	234		
Independent	T. Morris Evans	220		
Majority		14		
Independent hold		Swing		

=== Llanllwchaiarn ===
Llanllwchaiarn 1931
Party	Candidate	Votes	%	±%
Independent	Evan Parry Jenkins*	Unopposed		
Independent hold		Swing		

=== Llansantffraed ===
Llansantffraed 1931
Party	Candidate	Votes	%	±%
Independent	Capt. David Morgan	197		
Independent	Timothy James	143		
Independent	Frederick Jones*	102		
Majority		54		
Independent hold		Swing		

=== Llanwnen ===
Llanwnen 1931
Party	Candidate	Votes	%	±%
Independent	John Evans*	250		
Independent	Ex DCC Evans	64		
Majority		186		
Independent hold		Swing		

=== Llanwenog ===
Llanwenog 1928
Party	Candidate	Votes	%	±%
Independent	Meredith Ll. Gwarnant Williams*	436		
Independent	Rev J.H. Thomas	117		
Majority		319		
Independent hold		Swing		

=== Lledrod ===
Lledrod 1931
Party	Candidate	Votes	%	±%
Independent	Richard Daniel Herbert*	Unopposed		
Independent hold		Swing		

=== Nantcwnlle ===
Nantcwnlle 1931
Party	Candidate	Votes	%	±%
Independent	Evan Howells*	Unopposed		
Independent hold		Swing		

=== New Quay ===
New Quay 1931
Party	Candidate	Votes	%	±%
Independent	Evan James Davies*	Unopposed		
Independent hold		Swing		

=== Penbryn ===
Penbryn 1931
Party	Candidate	Votes	%	±%
Independent	John William Lewis*	Unopposed		
Independent hold		Swing		

=== Strata Florida ===
Strata Florida 1931
Party	Candidate	Votes	%	±%
Independent	Morgan Jones*	255		
Independent	William John Jones	216		
Majority		39		
Independent hold		Swing		

=== Taliesin ===
Taliesin 1931
Party	Candidate	Votes	%	±%
Independent	Basil Jones	Unopposed		
Independent hold		Swing		

=== Talybont ===
Talybont 1931
Party	Candidate	Votes	%	±%
Independent	Rev Fred Jones	Unopposed		
Independent hold		Swing		

=== Trefeurig ===
Trefeurig 1931
Party	Candidate	Votes	%	±%
Independent	William James	134		
Independent	Thomas Morgan	100		
Majority		34		
Independent hold		Swing		

=== Tregaron ===
Tregaron 1931
Party	Candidate	Votes	%	±%
Independent	Roderick Lloyd*	308		
Independent	M.D. Williams	173		
Majority		125		
Independent hold		Swing		

=== Troedyraur ===
Troedyraur 1931
Party	Candidate	Votes	%	±%
Independent	David Evans*	Unopposed		
Independent hold		Swing		

=== Ysbyty Ystwyth ===
Ysbyty Ystwyth 1931
Party	Candidate	Votes	%	±%
Independent	Morgan Lloyd Williams*	Unopposed		
Independent hold		Swing		

== Election of Aldermen ==
Eight aldermen were elected, with four being re-appointed, including R.J.R. Loxdale of Llanilar, who contested the seat for the first time since 1913. The long-serving member, D.C. Roberts, Aberystwyth, had not faced the electorate at the most recent election although he had stood regularly at previous elections. Four members who had been returned at the recent election were appointed, including E.J. Davies who had previously served as alderman from 1913 until 1919. W.E. Matthews had been elected to fill a vacancy some years earlier.

- D.C. Roberts, Aberystwyth
- R.J.R. Loxdale, Llanilar
- J.G. Morris Davies, Devil's Bridge
- E.J. Davies, New Quay
- J. Elias Jones, Llandysiliogogo
- W.E. Matthews, Cardigan
- J.W. Lewis, Llangrannog
- R.D. Herbert, Lledrod

== By-elections ==
Four by-elections were held following the election of aldermen. At Lledrod, Owen James Owen of Taihirion, Blaenpennal was returned unopposed. Dr Evan Jones, who had unsuccessfully stood against Meredith Gwarnant Williams at Llanwenog, was returned unopposed at the by-election. Three wards were contested but no party allegiances were declared.

=== Llandysiliogogo by-election ===
Cilcennin by-election 1922
Party	Candidate	Votes	%	±%
Independent	Evan Felix	258		
Independent	Jenkin Williams	196		
Majority		62		
Independent gain from Liberal		Swing		

=== Llangrannog by-election ===
Llandysul North by-election 1922
Party	Candidate	Votes	%	±%
Independent	Rev E.O. Jenkins	238		
Independent	William Davies	224		
Majority		14		
Independent gain from Liberal		Swing		

=== Lledrod by-election ===
Lledrod by-election 1922
Party	Candidate	Votes	%	±%
Independent	Owen James Owen	Unopposed		
Independent hold		Swing		

=== New Quay by-election ===
Llanwenog by-election 1922
Party	Candidate	Votes	%	±%
Independent	Dr Evan Jones	Unopposed		
Independent gain from Liberal		Swing		
