= 1937 Cardiganshire County Council election =

1937 Welsh local election

The sixteenth election to Cardiganshire County Council took place in March 1937. It was preceded by the 1934 election and, after those scheduled for 1940 and 1943 were postponed due to the Second World War, by the 1946 election.

== Candidates ==
36 of the 50 councillors were returned unopposed and this resulted in fourteen contests, one fewer than three years previously Political affiliations did not feature in the election.

== Retiring aldermen ==
Eight aldermen retired, of whom four sought election.

== Contested elections ==
Following the fourteen contests, three retiring members (including one who withdrew too late to be removed from the ballot paper) were defeated while two retiring aldermen were defeated by incumbent councillors.

== Outcome ==
Very little change took place as a result of an election in which only one sitting member lost his seat.

== Results ==
=== Aberaeron ===
Aberaeron 1937
Party	Candidate	Votes	%	±%
Independent	Mary Nesta Poulgrain*	Unopposed		
Independent hold		Swing		

=== Aberbanc ===
Aberbanc 1937
Party	Candidate	Votes	%	±%
Independent	Ieuan John Luke	501		
Independent	Benjamin John Davies*	423		
Majority		78		
Independent gain from Independent		Swing		

=== Aberporth ===
Aberporth 1937
Party	Candidate	Votes	%	±%
Independent	Rev Evan Melinfab Lewis	453		
Independent	Thomas Rhys Williams	179		
Majority		274		
Independent hold		Swing		

=== Aberystwyth Division 1 ===
Aberystwyth Division 1 1937
Party	Candidate	Votes	%	±%
Independent	William Edwards*	Unopposed		
Independent hold		Swing		

=== Aberystwyth Division 2 ===
Aberystwyth Division 2 1937
Party	Candidate	Votes	%	±%
Independent	Capt. B. Taylor Lloyd	Unopposed		
Independent hold		Swing		

=== Aberystwyth Division 3 ===
Aberystwyth Division 3 1937
Party	Candidate	Votes	%	±%
Independent	J. Barclay Jenkins*	Unopposed		
Independent hold		Swing		

=== Aberystwyth Division 4 ===
Aberystwyth Division 4 1937
Party	Candidate	Votes	%	±%
Independent	T.C. Jenkins*	Unopposed		
Independent hold		Swing		

=== Aberystwyth Division 5 ===
Aberystwyth Division 5 1937
Party	Candidate	Votes	%	±%
Independent	Mrs M.E. Roberts*	Unopposed		
Independent hold		Swing		

=== Aberystwyth Division 6 ===
Aberystwyth Division 6 1937
Party	Candidate	Votes	%	±%
Independent	Llewellyn Samuel*	Unopposed		
Independent hold		Swing		

=== Aeron ===
Aeron 1937
Party	Candidate	Votes	%	±%
Independent	Evan Thomas Davies*	Unopposed		
Independent hold		Swing		

=== Borth ===
Borth 1937
Party	Candidate	Votes	%	±%
Independent	William Jones*	Unopposed		
Independent hold		Swing		

=== Bow Street ===
Bow Street 1937
Party	Candidate	Votes	%	±%
Independent	Edward James*	Unopposed		
Independent hold		Swing		

=== Cardigan North ===
Cardigan North 1937
Party	Candidate	Votes	%	±%
Independent	Hubert Maxwell Davies*	Unopposed		
Independent hold		Swing		

=== Cardigan South ===
Cardigan South 1937
Party	Candidate	Votes	%	±%
Independent	John Evans*	Unopposed		
Independent hold		Swing		

=== Cilcennin ===
Cilcennin 1937
Party	Candidate	Votes	%	±%
Independent	Evan Evans	262		
Independent	Henry Lewis*	205		
Majority		57		
Independent gain from Independent		Swing		

=== Cwmrheidol ===
Cwmrheidol 1937
Party	Candidate	Votes	%	±%
Independent	Llew J. Lewis	Unopposed		
Independent hold		Swing		

=== Devil's Bridge ===
Devil's Bridge 1937
Party	Candidate	Votes	%	±%
Independent	J.G. Morris Davies**	Unopposed		
Independent hold		Swing		

=== Felinfach ===
Felinfach 1937
Party	Candidate	Votes	%	±%
Independent	Mrs Gladys Mary Douglas*	Unopposed		
Independent hold		Swing		

=== Goginan ===
Goginan 1937
Party	Candidate	Votes	%	±%
Independent	John Williams*	204		
Independent	William Thomas*	192		
Majority		12		
Independent hold		Swing		

=== Lampeter Borough ===
Lampeter Borough 1937
Party	Candidate	Votes	%	±%
Independent	William Lewis*	Unopposed		
Independent hold		Swing		

=== Llanarth ===
Llanarth 1937
Party	Candidate	Votes	%	±%
Independent	Rev J.M. Lloyd Thomas*	368		
Independent	David Christmas Evans	214		
Majority		154		
Independent hold		Swing		

=== Llanbadarn Fawr ===
Llanbadarn Fawr 1937
Party	Candidate	Votes	%	±%
Independent	Emile Thomas Evans*	Unopposed		
Independent hold		Swing		

=== Llanddewi Brefi ===
Llanddewi Brefi 1937
Party	Candidate	Votes	%	±%
Independent	Rev John Ellis Williams*	Unopposed		
Independent hold		Swing		

=== Llandygwydd ===
Llandygwydd 1937
Party	Candidate	Votes	%	±%
Independent	David James*	Unopposed		
Independent hold		Swing		

=== Llandysul North ===
Llandysul North 1937
Party	Candidate	Votes	%	±%
Independent	Josiah Richard Jones*	323		
Independent	Griffith Davies	250		
Majority		73		
Independent hold		Swing		

=== Llandysul South ===
Llandysul South 1937
Party	Candidate	Votes	%	±%
Independent	David Lewis*	Unopposed		
Independent hold		Swing		

=== Llansysiliogogo ===
Llandysiliogogo 1937
Party	Candidate	Votes	%	±%
Independent	Rees Williams*	285		
Independent	James Elias Jones+	220		
Majority		65		
Independent hold		Swing		

=== Llanfair Clydogau ===
Llanfair Clydogau 1937
Party	Candidate	Votes	%	±%
Independent	Joseph Gwyn Evans*	Unopposed		
Independent hold		Swing		

=== Llanfarian ===
Llanfarian 1937
Party	Candidate	Votes	%	±%
Independent	Richard Jones*	Unopposed		
Independent hold		Swing		

=== Llanfihangel y Creuddyn ===
Llanfihangel y Creuddyn 1937
Party	Candidate	Votes	%	±%
Independent	John Daniel Evans*	Unopposed		
Independent hold		Swing		

=== Llangoedmor ===
Llangoedmor 1937
Party	Candidate	Votes	%	±%
Independent	Evan Davies*	314		
Independent	T.D. Roberts	174		
Majority		140		
Independent hold		Swing		

=== Llangeitho ===
Llangeitho 1937
Party	Candidate	Votes	%	±%
Independent	Daniel Lodwick Herbert*	Unopposed		
Independent hold		Swing		

=== Llangrannog ===
Llangrannog 1937
Party	Candidate	Votes	%	±%
Independent	John Williams*	Unopposed		
Independent hold		Swing		

=== Llanilar ===
Llanilar 1937
Party	Candidate	Votes	%	±%
Independent	R.J.R. Loxdale+	Unopposed		
Independent hold		Swing		

=== Llanrhystyd ===
Llanrhystyd 1937
Party	Candidate	Votes	%	±%
Independent	Rowland Hugh Jones*	Unopposed		
Independent hold		Swing		

=== Llanllwchaiarn ===
Llanllwchaiarn 1937
Party	Candidate	Votes	%	±%
Independent	Evan Parry Jenkins*	Unopposed		
Independent hold		Swing		

=== Llansantffraed ===
Llansantffraed 1937
Party	Candidate	Votes	%	±%
Independent	Capt. David Morgan*	304		
Independent	Isaac Frederick Jones	190		
Majority		114		
Independent hold		Swing		

=== Llanwnen ===
Llanwnen 1937
Party	Candidate	Votes	%	±%
Independent	John Evans*	Unopposed		
Independent hold		Swing		

=== Llanwenog ===
Llanwenog 1937
Party	Candidate	Votes	%	±%
Independent	Meredith Ll. Gwarnant Williams*	Unopposed		
Independent hold		Swing		

=== Lledrod ===
Lledrod 1937
Party	Candidate	Votes	%	±%
Independent	Richard David Herbert**	Unopposed		
Independent hold		Swing		

=== Nantcwnlle ===
Nantcwnlle 1937
Party	Candidate	Votes	%	±%
Independent	John Edwardes Rogers Lewis	160		
Independent	John Lloyd Edwardes	134		
Majority		26		
Independent hold		Swing		

=== New Quay ===
New Quay 1937
Party	Candidate	Votes	%	±%
Independent	David Oswald Davies	318		
Independent	Jack Evans	287		
Majority		31		
Independent hold		Swing		

=== Penbryn ===
Penbryn 1937
Party	Candidate	Votes	%	±%
Independent	David Lloyd Thomas	259		
Independent	John William Lewis+	235		
Majority		24		
Independent hold		Swing		

=== Strata Florida ===
Strata Florida 1937
Party	Candidate	Votes	%	±%
Independent	Morgan Jones*	239		
Independent	William James Jones	159		
Majority		80		
Independent hold		Swing		

=== Taliesin ===
Taliesin 1937
Party	Candidate	Votes	%	±%
Independent	Basil Jones*	Unopposed		
Independent hold		Swing		

=== Talybont ===
Talybont 1937
Party	Candidate	Votes	%	±%
Independent	Rev Fred Jones*	Unopposed		
Independent hold		Swing		

=== Trefeurig ===
Trefeurig 1937
Party	Candidate	Votes	%	±%
Independent	Richard R. Davies	113		
Independent	John Thomas	110		
Independent	William James*	5		
Majority		3		
Independent gain from Independent		Swing		

=== Tregaron ===
Tregaron 1937
Party	Candidate	Votes	%	±%
Independent	Roderick Lloyd*	Unopposed		
Independent hold		Swing		

=== Troedyraur ===
Troedyraur 1937
Party	Candidate	Votes	%	±%
Independent	David Evans*	Unopposed		
Independent hold		Swing		

=== Ysbyty Ystwyth ===
Ysbyty Ystwyth 1937
Party	Candidate	Votes	%	±%
Independent	David Joshua Davies*	Unopposed		
Independent hold		Swing		

== Election of Aldermen ==
In addition to the 50 councillors the council consisted of 16 county aldermen. Aldermen were elected by the council, and served a six-year term. Following the 1937 election, there were eight aldermanic vacancies which were filled at the annual meeting. There was some controversy due to the fact that the principle did seniority was not observed in the selection of aldermen. The following retiring aldermen were re-elected:

- Sir D.C. Roberts, Aberystwyth
- R.J.R. Loxdale, Llanilar
- J.G. Morris Davies, Devil's Bridge
- E.J. Davies, New Quay
- W.E. Matthews, Cardigan

In addition, the following four new aldermen were elected:

- David Evans, Troeduraur
- Meredydd Ll.G. Williams, Llanwenog
- Rev John Ellis Williams, Llanddewi Brefi

The following retiring aldermen had been re-elected as members of the council but were not re-elected as aldermen:

- R.D. Herbert, Lledrod

The five re-elected aldermen had served at least two previous terms while Meredith Gwarnant Williams had been an alderman from 1922 until 1928.

== By-elections ==
Five by-elections were held following the election of aldermen. Morgan Davies was returned unopposed at Llanddewi Brefi as was the incumbent councillor at Llanilar, James Isaac, who had stood down in favour of Alderman Loxdale. New members were elected for the three other divisions, including Devil's Bridge where the veteran member T. Mason Jones, who had returned to the council in 1934 after fifteen years absence did not stand due to ill health.

=== Devil's Bridge by-election ===
Devil's Bridge by-election 1937
Party	Candidate	Votes	%	±%
Independent	Rev T. Noah Jones	180		
Independent	Morgan Morgan	129		
Majority		51		
Independent hold		Swing		

=== Llanddewi Brefi by-election ===
Llanddewi Brefi by-election 1934
Party	Candidate	Votes	%	±%
Independent	William Morgan Davies	Unopposed		
Independent hold		Swing		

=== Llanilar by-election ===
Llanilar by-election 1934
Party	Candidate	Votes	%	±%
Independent	James Isaac*	Unopposed		
Independent hold		Swing		

=== Llanwenog by-election ===
Llanwenog by-election 1937
Party	Candidate	Votes	%	±%
Independent	David Lloyd James	391		
Independent	J. Elias Jones	213		
Majority		178		
Independent hold		Swing		

=== Troedyraur by-election ===
Troedyraur by-election 1937
Party	Candidate	Votes	%	±%
Independent	James Jenkins Davies	484		
Independent	Owen Evans	331		
Majority		153		
Independent hold		Swing		
