= 1934 Cardiganshire County Council election =

1934 Welsh local election

The fifteenth election to Cardiganshire County Council took place in March 1934. It was preceded by the 1931 election and followed by the 1937 election.

== Candidates ==
34 of the 50 councillors were returned unopposed and the Rev T. Mason Jones, now aged 75 who had served as chairman of the Council in 1899-1900 was returned unopposed at Devils Bridge. This resulted in fifteen contests, the same number as three years previously Political affiliations did not feature in the election.

== Retiring aldermen ==
Eight aldermen retired, of whom only D. Rees Morgan (Bow Street) contested the election. The sitting councillor, Edward James, stood down in his favour.

== Contested elections ==
Following the fifteen contests, eleven new members were elected and four siting members defeated, including the Rev E.O. Jenkins who lost at Llandysul to retiring alderman Josiah Jones. Seats were not fought on political lines.

== Outcome ==
Very little change took place as a result of an election in which only one sitting member lost his seat.

== Division results ==
=== Aberaeron ===
Aberaeron 1934
Party	Candidate	Votes	%	±%
Independent	Dr David Morgan Davies*	Unopposed		
Independent hold		Swing		

=== Aberbanc ===
Aberbanc 1934
Party	Candidate	Votes	%	±%
Independent	Rev Evan James Davies*	Unopposed		
Independent hold		Swing		

=== Aberporth ===
Aberporth 1934
Party	Candidate	Votes	%	±%
Independent	Samuel Griffiths Davies*	308		
Independent	Rev Evan Melinfab Davies	288		
Majority		20		
Independent hold		Swing		

=== Aberystwyth Division 1 ===
Aberystwyth Division 1 1934
Party	Candidate	Votes	%	±%
Independent	William Edwards*	Unopposed		
Independent hold		Swing		

=== Aberystwyth Division 2 ===
Aberystwyth Division 2 1934
Party	Candidate	Votes	%	±%
Independent	Capt. B. Taylor Lloyd	Unopposed		
Independent hold		Swing		

=== Aberystwyth Division 3 ===
Aberystwyth Division 3 1934
Party	Candidate	Votes	%	±%
Independent	J. Barclay Jenkins*	Unopposed		
Independent hold		Swing		

=== Aberystwyth Division 4 ===
Aberystwyth Division 4 1934
Party	Candidate	Votes	%	±%
Independent	T.C. Jenkins*	Unopposed		
Independent hold		Swing		

=== Aberystwyth Division 5 ===
Aberystwyth Division 5 1934
Party	Candidate	Votes	%	±%
Independent	Mrs M.E. Roberts*	Unopposed		
Independent hold		Swing		

=== Aberystwyth Division 6 ===
Aberystwyth Division 6 1934
Party	Candidate	Votes	%	±%
Independent	Llewellyn Samuel*	Unopposed		
Independent hold		Swing		

=== Aeron ===
Aeron 1934
Party	Candidate	Votes	%	±%
Independent	Evan Thomas Davies*	Unopposed		
Independent hold		Swing		

=== Borth ===
Borth 1934
Party	Candidate	Votes	%	±%
Independent	William Jones*	Unopposed		
Independent hold		Swing		

=== Bow Street ===
Bow Street 1934
Party	Candidate	Votes	%	±%
Independent	D. Rees Morgan**	Unopposed		
Independent hold		Swing		

=== Cardigan North ===
Cardigan North 1934
Party	Candidate	Votes	%	±%
Independent	Hubert Maxwell Davies*	Unopposed		
Independent hold		Swing		

=== Cardigan South ===
Cardigan South 1934
Party	Candidate	Votes	%	±%
Independent	John Evans*	Unopposed		
Independent hold		Swing		

=== Cilcennin ===
Cilcennin 1934
Party	Candidate	Votes	%	±%
Independent	Henry Lewis	252		
Independent	Evan Evans*	190		
Majority		62		
Independent gain from Independent		Swing		

=== Cwmrheidol ===
Cwmrheidol 1934
Party	Candidate	Votes	%	±%
Independent	John Morgan*	Unopposed		
Independent hold		Swing		

=== Devil's Bridge ===
Devil's Bridge 1934
Party	Candidate	Votes	%	±%
Independent	Rev T. Mason Jones	Unopposed		
Independent hold		Swing		

=== Felinfach ===
Felinfach 1934
Party	Candidate	Votes	%	±%
Independent	Mrs Gladys Mary Douglas*	Unopposed		
Independent hold		Swing		

=== Goginan ===
Goginan 1934
Party	Candidate	Votes	%	±%
Independent	John Williams	206		
Independent	William Thomas*	173		
Majority		33		
Independent gain from Independent		Swing		

=== Lampeter Borough ===
Lampeter Borough 1934
Party	Candidate	Votes	%	±%
Independent	Walter Davies*	308		
Independent	Rev Evan Melinfab Davies	288		
Majority		20		
Independent hold		Swing		

=== Llanarth ===
Llanarth 1934
Party	Candidate	Votes	%	±%
Independent	Rev J.M. Lloyd Thomas	183		
Independent	Rev D.T. Jones	171		
Independent	E.B. Byron Jones	156		
Independent	David Christmas Evans	95		
Majority		12		
Independent hold		Swing		

=== Llanbadarn Fawr ===
Llanbadarn Fawr 1934
Party	Candidate	Votes	%	±%
Independent	Emile Thomas Evans*	Unopposed		
Independent hold		Swing		

=== Llanddewi Brefi ===
Llanddewi Brefi 1934
Party	Candidate	Votes	%	±%
Independent	Rev John Ellis Williams*	Unopposed		
Independent hold		Swing		

=== Llandygwydd ===
Llandygwydd 1934
Party	Candidate	Votes	%	±%
Independent	David James*	362		
Independent	J. Gwendraeth James	142		
Majority		220		
Independent hold		Swing		

=== Llandysul North ===
Llandysul North 1934
Party	Candidate	Votes	%	±%
Independent	Josiah Richard Jones	321		
Independent	Rev Evan Owen Jenkins*	265		
Majority		56		
Independent gain from Independent		Swing		

=== Llandysul South ===
Llandysul South 1934
Party	Candidate	Votes	%	±%
Independent	David Lewis*	Unopposed		
Independent hold		Swing		

=== Llansysiliogogo ===
Llandysiliogogo 1934
Party	Candidate	Votes	%	±%
Independent	Rees Williams*	Unopposed		
Independent hold		Swing		

=== Llanfair Clydogau ===
Llanfair Clydogau 1934
Party	Candidate	Votes	%	±%
Independent	Joseph Gwyn Evans	298		
Independent	Rev W. Aneurin Jenkins	207		
Majority		91		
Independent hold		Swing		

=== Llanfarian ===
Llanfarian 1934
Party	Candidate	Votes	%	±%
Independent	Richard Jones*	Unopposed		
Independent hold		Swing		

=== Llanfihangel y Creuddyn ===
Llanfihangel y Creuddyn 1934
Party	Candidate	Votes	%	±%
Independent	John Daniel Evans	Unopposed		
Independent hold		Swing		

=== Llangoedmor ===
Llangoedmor 1934
Party	Candidate	Votes	%	±%
Independent	Evan Davies*	Unopposed		
Independent hold		Swing		

=== Llangeitho ===
Llangeitho 1934
Party	Candidate	Votes	%	±%
Independent	Edward Jones*	Unopposed		
Independent hold		Swing		

=== Llangrannog ===
Llangrannog 1934
Party	Candidate	Votes	%	±%
Independent	John Williams*	213		
Independent	William Williams	148		
Majority		65		
Independent hold		Swing		

=== Llanilar ===
Llanilar 1934
Party	Candidate	Votes	%	±%
Independent	James Isaac*	Unopposed		
Independent hold		Swing		

=== Llanrhystyd ===
Llanrhystyd 1934
Party	Candidate	Votes	%	±%
Independent	R. Hugh Jones*	279		
Independent	Jenkin Griffiths	162		
Majority		117		
Independent hold		Swing		

=== Llanllwchaiarn ===
Llanllwchaiarn 1934
Party	Candidate	Votes	%	±%
Independent	Evan Parry Jenkins*	Unopposed		
Independent hold		Swing		

=== Llansantffraed ===
Llansantffraed 1934
Party	Candidate	Votes	%	±%
Independent	Capt. David Morgan*	247		
Independent	Isaac Frederick Jones	196		
Majority		51		
Independent hold		Swing		

=== Llanwnen ===
Llanwnen 1934
Party	Candidate	Votes	%	±%
Independent	John Evans*	Unopposed		
Independent hold		Swing		

=== Llanwenog ===
Llanwenog 1934
Party	Candidate	Votes	%	±%
Independent	Meredith Ll. Gwarnant Williams*	Unopposed		
Independent hold		Swing		

=== Lledrod ===
Lledrod 1934
Party	Candidate	Votes	%	±%
Independent	Owen James Owen*	Unopposed		
Independent hold		Swing		

=== Nantcwnlle ===
Nantcwnlle 1934
Party	Candidate	Votes	%	±%
Independent	David Lodwick Herbert	200		
Independent	John Edwardes Rogers Lewis	128		
Majority		72		
Independent hold		Swing		

=== New Quay ===
New Quay 1934
Party	Candidate	Votes	%	±%
Independent	Dr H.D.G. Jones	235		
Independent	Jack Evans	212		
Independent	Trevor Daniels	93		
Independent	J. Jones Evans	34		
Majority		23		
Independent hold		Swing		

=== Penbryn ===
Penbryn 1934
Party	Candidate	Votes	%	±%
Independent	Kate Olwen Evans*	Unopposed		
Independent hold		Swing		

=== Strata Florida ===
Strata Florida 1934
Party	Candidate	Votes	%	±%
Independent	Morgan Jones*	Unopposed		
Independent hold		Swing		

=== Taliesin ===
Taliesin 1934
Party	Candidate	Votes	%	±%
Independent	Basil Jones*	Unopposed		
Independent hold		Swing		

=== Talybont ===
Talybont 1934
Party	Candidate	Votes	%	±%
Independent	Rev Fred Jones*	Unopposed		
Independent hold		Swing		

=== Trefeurig ===
Trefeurig 1934
Party	Candidate	Votes	%	±%
Independent	William James*	169		
Independent	John Thomas	81		
Majority		88		
Independent hold		Swing		

=== Tregaron ===
Tregaron 1934
Party	Candidate	Votes	%	±%
Independent	Roderick Lloyd*	Unopposed		
Independent hold		Swing		

=== Troedyraur ===
Troedyraur 1934
Party	Candidate	Votes	%	±%
Independent	David Evans*	557		
Independent	William George Jones	288		
Majority		343		
Independent hold		Swing		

=== Ysbyty Ystwyth ===
Ysbyty Ystwyth 1934
Party	Candidate	Votes	%	±%
Independent	Morgan Lloyd Williams*	Unopposed		
Independent hold		Swing		

== Election of Aldermen ==
In addition to the 50 councillors the council consisted of 16 county aldermen. Aldermen were elected by the council, and served a six-year term. Following the 1934 election, there were eight Aldermanic vacancies which were filled at the annual meeting. The following retiring aldermen were re-elected:

- John Evans, Aberystwyth
- Simon Davies, Felinfach
- Richard Evans, Llangoedmor
- Jenkin E. Evans, Talybont

In addition, the following four new aldermen were elected:

- Rev E.J. Davies, Aberbanc
- D. Rees Morgan (Bow Street)
- M. Lloyd Williams, Ysbyty Ystwyth
- Dr D.M. Davies, Aberaeron

The following retiring aldermen had been re-elected as members of the council but were not re-elected as aldermen:

- D.L. Herbert, Llangeitho
- Josiah T. Jones, Llandysul

== By-elections ==
Four by-elections were held following the election of aldermen. Two new members were elected after contests at Aberaeron and at Ysbyty Ystwyth. At Bow Street, Edward James was returned unopposed in place of D. Rees Morgan. A four cornered contest at Aberbanc led to the election of B.J. Davies, a farmer and member of Newcastle Emlyn Rural District Council, was elected.

=== Aberaeron by-election ===
Aberaeron by-election 1934
Party	Candidate	Votes	%	±%
Independent	Mary Nesta Poulgrain	200		
Independent	John Hugh Jones	166		
Independent	Evan Jones	147		
Independent	Frederick Basil Evans	100		
Majority		34		
Independent hold		Swing		

=== Aberbanc by-election ===
Aberbanc by-election 1934
Party	Candidate	Votes	%	±%
Independent	Benjamin John Davies	313		
Independent	Ieuan John Luke	302		
Independent	B.J. James	166		
Independent	D. Davies	127		
Majority		11		
Independent hold		Swing		

=== Bow Street by-election ===
Bow Street by-election 1934
Party	Candidate	Votes	%	±%
Independent	Edward James	Unopposed		
Independent hold		Swing		

=== Ysbyty Ystwyth by-election ===
Ysbyty Ystwyth by-election 1934
Party	Candidate	Votes	%	±%
Independent	David Joshua Davies	200		
Independent	Sarah Jane Jones	162		
Majority		38		
Independent hold		Swing		
