= 1925 Cardiganshire County Council election =

1925 Welsh local election

The twelfth election to Cardiganshire County Council took place in March 1925. It was preceded by the 1922 election and followed by the 1928 election. While the previous election had been held in the shadow of bitter Liberal infighting at parliamentary level, the temperature had cooled and only ten seats were contested.

== Candidates ==
The election saw only ten contests, compared with 24 three years previously. With hindsight this can be seen as the start of half century of Independent domination in the local politics of Cardiganshire. (Note: Although political affiliations were not included in press coverage of the election, the affiliations noted at the 1928 election have been used in this article) Although political affiliations were no longer a feature of most contests the split in the Liberal ranks between Coalition and Asquithian Liberals had largely disappeared and some individuals had drifted away from Liberalism towards the Conservatives (one example being Morgan Lloyd Williams at Ysbyty Ystwyth).

== Retiring aldermen ==
Eight aldermen retired, seven of whom were Liberals and one Conservative, R.S. Rowland of Gareth, Llangybi. Two of their number, D.C. Roberts (who had previously contested his seat at Aberystwyth) and the sole Conservative sought election.

The other retiring aldermen were the Rev. John Williams, Cardigan, who had not faced the electorate for many years; the Rev William Griffiths (New Quay), the Rev T. Mason Jones, (Devil's Bridge) and R.J.R. Loxdale (Llanilar) who last faced an election in 1913; and John Morgan Howell (Aberaeron) and Thomas Davies (Newcastle Emlyn) who had been elected to fill vacancies in recent years.

== Contested elections ==
Only ten seats were contested and these were largely fought on non-political lines. Two seats can be said to have changed hands but in both cases this resulted in the sitting member not seeking re-election. At Lampeter, J.C. Harford's seat was won by a Liberal and at Llangybi, the sitting Liberal stood down allowing Alderman R.S. Rowland, the Garth, to be returned unopposed.

== Outcome ==
Very little change resulted from the election of 1925. Three members of the originally elected council in 1889 remained as members, namely Aldermen John Morgan Howell, Peter Jones and C.M. Williams.

== Division results ==
=== Aberaeron ===
Aberaeron 1925
Party	Candidate	Votes	%	±%
Conservative	Dr David Morgan Davies*	Unopposed		
Conservative hold		Swing		

=== Aberbanc ===
Aberbanc 1925
Party	Candidate	Votes	%	±%
Liberal	Rev Evan James Davies*	Unopposed		
Liberal hold		Swing		

=== Aberporth ===
Aberporth 1925
Party	Candidate	Votes	%	±%
Liberal	Samuel Griffiths Davies*	Unopposed		
Liberal hold		Swing		

=== Aberystwyth Division 1 ===
Aberystwyth Division 1 1925
Party	Candidate	Votes	%	±%
Liberal	William Edwards*	Unopposed		
Liberal hold		Swing		

=== Aberystwyth Division 2 ===
Aberystwyth Division 2 1925
Party	Candidate	Votes	%	±%
Conservative	Mrs E.K. Jones*	Unopposed		
Conservative hold		Swing		

=== Aberystwyth Division 3 ===
Aberystwyth Division 3 1925
Party	Candidate	Votes	%	±%
Independent	J. Barclay Jenkins*	Unopposed		
Independent hold		Swing		

=== Aberystwyth Division 4 ===
Aberystwyth Division 4 1925
Party	Candidate	Votes	%	±%
Liberal	D.C. Roberts**	Unopposed		
Liberal hold		Swing		

=== Aberystwyth Division 5 ===
Aberystwyth Division 5 1925
Party	Candidate	Votes	%	±%
Liberal	John Evans*	Unopposed		
Liberal hold		Swing		

=== Aberystwyth Division 6 ===
Aberystwyth Division 6 1925
Party	Candidate	Votes	%	±%
Liberal	Llewellyn Samuel*	203		
Liberal	T.H. Edwards	171		
Majority		32		
Liberal hold		Swing		

=== Aeron ===
Aeron 1925
Party	Candidate	Votes	%	±%
Liberal	Evan Thomas Davies	Unopposed		
Liberal hold		Swing		

=== Borth ===
Borth 1925
Party	Candidate	Votes	%	±%
Liberal	R.E. Jones*	Unopposed		
Liberal hold		Swing		

=== Bow Street ===
Bow Street 1925
Party	Candidate	Votes	%	±%
Liberal	David Rees Morgan*	Unopposed		
Liberal hold		Swing		

=== Cardigan North ===
Cardigan North 1925
Party	Candidate	Votes	%	±%
Liberal	William Edward Matthews*	Unopposed		
Liberal hold		Swing		

=== Cardigan South ===
Cardigan South 1925
Party	Candidate	Votes	%	±%
Conservative	John Evans*	Unopposed		
Conservative hold		Swing		

=== Cilcennin ===
Cilcennin 1925
Party	Candidate	Votes	%	±%
Liberal	Evan Evans	Unopposed		
Liberal hold		Swing		

=== Cwmrheidol ===
Cwmrheidol 1925
Party	Candidate	Votes	%	±%
Liberal	John Morgan*	Unopposed		
Liberal hold		Swing		

=== Devil's Bridge ===
Devil's Bridge 1925
Party	Candidate	Votes	%	±%
Conservative	J.G. Morris Davies*	Unopposed		
Conservative hold		Swing		

=== Felinfach ===
Felinfach 1925
Party	Candidate	Votes	%	±%
Liberal	Simon Davies*	Unopposed		
Liberal hold		Swing		

=== Goginan ===
Goginan 1925
Party	Candidate	Votes	%	±%
Liberal	William Griffiths*	Unopposed		
Liberal hold		Swing		

=== Lampeter Borough ===
Lampeter Borough 1925
Party	Candidate	Votes	%	±%
Liberal	Walter Davies	417		
Independent	Rev T. Oswald Williams	325		
Majority		92		
Liberal gain from Conservative		Swing		

=== Llanarth ===
Llanarth 1925
Party	Candidate	Votes	%	±%
Liberal	Evan Lloyd*	Unopposed		
Liberal hold		Swing		

=== Llanbadarn Fawr ===
Llanbadarn Fawr 1925
Party	Candidate	Votes	%	±%
Conservative	Henry Bonsall*	Unopposed		
Conservative hold		Swing		

=== Llanddewi Brefi ===
Llanddewi Brefi 1925
Party	Candidate	Votes	%	±%
Conservative	R.S. Rowland**	Unopposed		
Conservative gain from Liberal		Swing		

=== Llandygwydd ===
Llandygwydd 1925
Party	Candidate	Votes	%	±%
Liberal	David James*	Unopposed		
Liberal hold		Swing		

=== Llandysul North ===
Llandysul North 1925
Party	Candidate	Votes	%	±%
Liberal	William Davies	Unopposed		
Liberal hold		Swing		

=== Llandysul South ===
Llandysul South 1925
Party	Candidate	Votes	%	±%
Liberal	Rev Thomas Arthur Thomas*	430		
Conservative	William Jones	289		
Majority		141		
Liberal hold		Swing		

=== Llansysiliogogo ===
Llandysiliogogo 1925
Party	Candidate	Votes	%	±%
Liberal	James Elias Jones*	Unopposed		
Liberal hold		Swing		

=== Llanfair Clydogau ===
Llanfair Clydogau 1925
Party	Candidate	Votes	%	±%
Conservative	Tom Davies*	Unopposed		
Conservative hold		Swing		

=== Llanfarian ===
Llanfarian 1925
Party	Candidate	Votes	%	±%
Liberal	Richard Jones	Unopposed		
Liberal hold		Swing		

=== Llanfihangel y Creuddyn ===
Llanfihangel y Creuddyn 1925
Party	Candidate	Votes	%	±%
Liberal	Thomas Evans Joel*	Unopposed		
Liberal hold		Swing		

=== Llangoedmor ===
Llangoedmor 1925
Party	Candidate	Votes	%	±%
Liberal	Evan Davies*	254		
Independent	Rev Evan Lewis	212		
Majority		42		
Liberal hold		Swing		

=== Llangeitho ===
Llangeitho 1925
Party	Candidate	Votes	%	±%
Liberal	Dr David Davies*	Unopposed		
Liberal hold		Swing		

=== Llangrannog ===
Llangrannog 1925
Party	Candidate	Votes	%	±%
Liberal	Samuel Jones*	Unopposed		
Liberal hold		Swing		

=== Llanilar ===
Llanilar 1925
Party	Candidate	Votes	%	±%
Liberal	D.W. Lewis	317		
Liberal	Isaac Jones*	141		
Majority		176		
Liberal hold		Swing		

=== Llanrhystyd ===
Llanrhystyd 1922
Party	Candidate	Votes	%	±%
Liberal	D. Morgan James*	205		
Liberal	David Lewis	146		
Independent	David Lewis	96		
Majority		59		
Liberal hold		Swing		

=== Llanllwchaiarn ===
Llanllwchaiarn 1925
Party	Candidate	Votes	%	±%
Liberal	Evan Lewis*	Unopposed		
Liberal hold		Swing		

=== Llansantffraed ===
Llansantffraed 1922
Party	Candidate	Votes	%	±%
Liberal	Frederick Jones	192		
Liberal	Henry Lewis	187		
Liberal	D. Alban Lloyd	9		
Majority		5		
Liberal hold		Swing		

=== Llanwnen ===
Llanwnen 1925
Party	Candidate	Votes	%	±%
Independent	Dr Evan Evans*	Unopposed		
Independent hold		Swing		

=== Llanwenog ===
Llanwenog 1925
Party	Candidate	Votes	%	±%
Liberal	Dr Evan Jones*	312		
Independent	J.J. Thomas	264		
Majority		48		
Liberal hold		Swing		

=== Lledrod ===
Lledrod 1925
Party	Candidate	Votes	%	±%
Liberal	Richard Daniel Herbert*	Unopposed		
Liberal hold		Swing		

=== Nantcwnlle ===
Nantcwnlle 1925
Party	Candidate	Votes	%	±%
Liberal	Daniel Lewis Herbert*	Unopposed		
Liberal hold		Swing		

=== New Quay ===
New Quay 1925
Party	Candidate	Votes	%	±%
Liberal	Evan James Davies*	Unopposed		
Liberal hold		Swing		

=== Penbryn ===
Penbryn 1925
Party	Candidate	Votes	%	±%
Liberal	John William Lewis*	Unopposed		
Liberal hold		Swing		

=== Strata Florida ===
Strata Florida 1925
Party	Candidate	Votes	%	±%
Conservative	Dr John Morgan*	Unopposed		
Conservative hold		Swing		

=== Taliesin ===
Taliesin 1925
Party	Candidate	Votes	%	±%
Conservative	Audry Dorothy Loxdale Jones	Unopposed		
Conservative hold		Swing		

=== Talybont ===
Talybont 1925
Party	Candidate	Votes	%	±%
Liberal	Jenkin Evan Evans*	Unopposed		
Liberal hold		Swing		

=== Trefeurig ===
Trefeurig 1922
Party	Candidate	Votes	%	±%
Liberal	David James	160		
Liberal	J. Owen Jones	59		
Majority		101		
Liberal hold		Swing		

=== Tregaron ===
Tregaron 1925
Party	Candidate	Votes	%	±%
Liberal	Mary Lloyd*	Unopposed		
Liberal hold		Swing		

=== Troedyraur ===
Troedyraur 1925
Party	Candidate	Votes	%	±%
Liberal	David Evans*	Unopposed		
Liberal hold		Swing		

=== Ysbyty Ystwyth ===
Ysbyty Ystwyth 1925
Party	Candidate	Votes	%	±%
Conservative	Morgan Lloyd Williams	151		
Liberal	Joshua Williams	124		
Majority		27		
Conservative hold		Swing		

== Election of Aldermen ==
Eight aldermen were elected, including one Conservative, Dr John Morgan, who replaced R.S. Rowland. As well as Dr Morgan, Evan Lewis, Samuel Jones and D. Morgan James became new aldermen, while retiring alderman D.C. Roberts had yet again been returned unopposed at Aberystwyth.

Of the three retiring aldermen re-appointed without facing the electorate, J.M. Howell had fought a contested election in 1922 and was re-appointed as alderman after the death of E. Lima Jones. Loxdale had last been returned unopposed in 1910 while the Rev. John Williams had not stood as a candidate since 1898.

- Evan Lewis, Llanllwchaiarn, 48
- Rev. John Williams, Cardigan, 47
- D.C. Roberts, Aberystwyth, 48
- R.J.R. Loxdale, Llanilar, 47
- John Morgan Howell, Aberaeron, 47
- Dr John Morgan, Pontrhydygroes, 46
- Samuel Jones, Llangrannog, 45
- D. Morgan James, Llanrhystud, 37

== By-elections ==
=== Aberystwyth, Division 4 by-election ===
E.J. Evans, Cwncybarcud, who previously represented Llanrhystud from 1901 until 1904 was returned unopposed following the appointment of R.J.R. Loxdale as alderman.

Llanilar by-election 1910
Party	Candidate	Votes	%	±%
Liberal	E.J. Evans	unopposed		
Liberal hold		Swing		

=== Llangrannog by-election ===
A Liberal candidate was returned unopposed for Lledrod following the appointment of Daniel L. Jones as alderman.

Lledrod by-election 1910
Party	Candidate	Votes	%	±%
Liberal	Rev T.R. Morgan	unopposed		
Liberal hold		Swing		

=== Llanllwchaiarn by-election ===
Following the appointment of E.J. Davies as alderman no valid nomination was initially received.

New Quay by-election 1910
Party	Candidate	Votes	%	±%
Liberal	Evan James Davies*	unopposed		
Liberal hold		Swing		

=== Llanrhystud by-election ===
Troedyraur by-election 1910
Party	Candidate	Votes	%	±%
Liberal	Rev Daniel Evans*	unopposed		
Independent	Rev. Evan Lewis	204		
Independent	Rev. Evan Lewis	204		
Majority		260		
Liberal hold		Swing		

=== Strata Florida by-election ===
Troedyraur by-election 1910
Party	Candidate	Votes	%	±%
Liberal	Rev Daniel Evans*	unopposed		
Independent	Rev. Evan Lewis	204		
Independent	Rev. Evan Lewis	204		
Majority		260		
Liberal hold		Swing		
