= 1928 Cardiganshire County Council election =

1928 Welsh local election

The thirteenth election to Cardiganshire County Council took place in March 1928. It was preceded by the 1925 election and followed by the 1931 election.

== Candidates ==
After a period of bitter Liberal infighting in Cardiganshire politics in the early 1920s, a far less dramatic era ensued and in 1928 only ten seats were contested, the same number as three years earlier. This resulted in 40 members being returned without a contest.

== Retiring aldermen ==
Eight aldermen retired, but only Meredith Gwarnant Williams (Llanwenog) stood as a candidate in the election.

== Gains and losses ==
Very few seats changed hands.

== Contested elections ==
Only ten seats were contested and these were not largely fought on political lines.

== Outcome ==
Very little change took place as a result of an election in which only one sitting member lost his seat.

== Division results ==
=== Aberaeron ===
Aberaeron 1928
Party	Candidate	Votes	%	±%
Conservative	Dr David Morgan Davies*	Unopposed		
Conservative hold		Swing		

=== Aberbanc ===
Aberbanc 1928
Party	Candidate	Votes	%	±%
Liberal	Rev Evan James Davies*	Unopposed		
Liberal hold		Swing		

=== Aberporth ===
Aberporth 1928
Party	Candidate	Votes	%	±%
Liberal	Samuel Griffiths Davies	Unopposed		
Liberal hold		Swing		

=== Aberystwyth Division 1 ===
Aberystwyth Division 1 1928
Party	Candidate	Votes	%	±%
Liberal	William Edwards*	Unopposed		
Liberal hold		Swing		

=== Aberystwyth Division 2 ===
Aberystwyth Division 2 1928
Party	Candidate	Votes	%	±%
Conservative	Mrs E.K. Jones*	Unopposed		
Conservative hold		Swing		

=== Aberystwyth Division 3 ===
Aberystwyth Division 3 1928
Party	Candidate	Votes	%	±%
Independent	J. Barclay Jenkins*	Unopposed		
Independent hold		Swing		

=== Aberystwyth Division 4 ===
Aberystwyth Division 4 1928
Party	Candidate	Votes	%	±%
Liberal	T.C. Jenkins*	Unopposed		
Liberal hold		Swing		

=== Aberystwyth Division 5 ===
Aberystwyth Division 5 1928
Party	Candidate	Votes	%	±%
Liberal	John Evans**	Unopposed		
Liberal hold		Swing		

=== Aberystwyth Division 6 ===
Aberystwyth Division 6 1928
Party	Candidate	Votes	%	±%
Liberal	Llewellyn Samuel*	Unopposed		
Liberal hold		Swing		

=== Aeron ===
Aeron 1928
Party	Candidate	Votes	%	±%
Liberal	Evan Thomas Davies*	Unopposed		
Liberal hold		Swing		

=== Borth ===
Borth 1928
Party	Candidate	Votes	%	±%
Liberal	William Jones	Unopposed		
Liberal hold		Swing		

=== Bow Street ===
Bow Street 1928
Party	Candidate	Votes	%	±%
Liberal	David Rees Morgan*	Unopposed		
Liberal hold		Swing		

=== Cardigan North ===
Cardigan North 1928
Party	Candidate	Votes	%	±%
Liberal	William Edward Matthews*	Unopposed		
Liberal hold		Swing		

=== Cardigan South ===
Cardigan South 1928
Party	Candidate	Votes	%	±%
Conservative	John Evans*	Unopposed		
Conservative hold		Swing		

=== Cilcennin ===
Cilcennin 1928
Party	Candidate	Votes	%	±%
Liberal	Evan Evans	268		
Liberal	Evan Felix	231		
Majority		37		
Liberal hold		Swing		

=== Cwmrheidol ===
Cwmrheidol 1928
Party	Candidate	Votes	%	±%
Liberal	John Morgan*	Unopposed		
Liberal hold		Swing		

=== Devil's Bridge ===
Devil's Bridge 1928
Party	Candidate	Votes	%	±%
Conservative	J.G. Morris Davies*	Unopposed		
Conservative hold		Swing		

=== Felinfach ===
Felinfach 1928
Party	Candidate	Votes	%	±%
Liberal	Simon Davies*	Unopposed		
Liberal hold		Swing		

=== Goginan ===
Goginan 1928
Party	Candidate	Votes	%	±%
Liberal	John Williams	Unopposed		
Liberal hold		Swing		

=== Lampeter Borough ===
Lampeter Borough 1928
Party	Candidate	Votes	%	±%
Liberal	Walter Davies	Unopposed		
Liberal hold		Swing		

=== Llanarth ===
Llanarth 1925
Party	Candidate	Votes	%	±%
Conservative	Rev David Thomas Jones	209		
Liberal	Cast. Benjamin Phillips	200		
Conservative	William Mabon Rees	174		
Majority		9		
Conservative gain from Liberal		Swing		

=== Llanbadarn Fawr ===
Llanbadarn Fawr 1928
Party	Candidate	Votes	%	±%
Conservative	Henry Bonsall*	368		
Labour	Mary Westrope	93		
Majority		275		
Conservative hold		Swing		

=== Llanddewi Brefi ===
Llanddewi Brefi 1928
Party	Candidate	Votes	%	±%
Liberal	Rev John Ellis Williams	274		
Conservative	Rev Thomas Rogers Davies	221		
Majority		53		
Liberal gain from Conservative		Swing		

=== Llandygwydd ===
Llandygwydd 1928
Party	Candidate	Votes	%	±%
Liberal	David James*	Unopposed		
Liberal hold		Swing		

=== Llandysul North ===
Llandysul North 1928
Party	Candidate	Votes	%	±%
Liberal	Rev. Evan Oliver Jenkins*	Unopposed		
Liberal hold		Swing		

=== Llandysul South ===
Llandysul South 1928
Party	Candidate	Votes	%	±%
Liberal	Rev Thomas Arthur Thomas*	542		
Liberal	William Evans	277		
Majority		265		
Liberal hold		Swing		

=== Llansysiliogogo ===
Llandysiliogogo 1928
Party	Candidate	Votes	%	±%
Liberal	James Elias Jones*	Unopposed		
Liberal hold		Swing		

=== Llanfair Clydogau ===
The seat was held in 1925 by Tom Davies (Conservative).

Llanfair Clydogau 1928
Party	Candidate	Votes	%	±%
Liberal	Benjamin Williams*	Unopposed		
Liberal hold		Swing		

=== Llanfarian ===
Llanfarian 1928
Party	Candidate	Votes	%	±%
Liberal	Richard Jones	Unopposed		
Liberal hold		Swing		

=== Llanfihangel y Creuddyn ===
Llanfihangel y Creuddyn 1928
Party	Candidate	Votes	%	±%
Liberal	Thomas Evans Joel	Unopposed		
Liberal hold		Swing		

=== Llangoedmor ===
Llangoedmor 1928
Party	Candidate	Votes	%	±%
Liberal	Evan Davies*	Unopposed		
Liberal hold		Swing		

=== Llangeitho ===
Llangeitho 1928
Party	Candidate	Votes	%	±%
Liberal	Dr David Davies*	Unopposed		
Liberal hold		Swing		

=== Llangrannog ===
Llangrannog 1928
Party	Candidate	Votes	%	±%
Liberal	John Williams*	Unopposed		
Liberal hold		Swing		

=== Llanilar ===
Llanilar 1928
Party	Candidate	Votes	%	±%
Liberal	D.W. Lewis*	248		
Liberal	Isaac Jones	234		
Majority		176		
Liberal hold		Swing		

=== Llanrhystyd ===
Llanrhystyd 1928
Party	Candidate	Votes	%	±%
Liberal	Evan Evans*	308		
Liberal	David Lewis	160		
Majority		148		
Liberal hold		Swing		

=== Llanllwchaiarn ===
Llanllwchaiarn 1928
Party	Candidate	Votes	%	±%
Liberal	Evan Parry Jenkins*	Unopposed		
Liberal hold		Swing		

=== Llansantffraed ===
Llansantffraed 1928
Party	Candidate	Votes	%	±%
Liberal	Frederick Jones*	252		
National Liberal	Capt. David Morgan	183		
Majority		69		
Liberal hold		Swing		

=== Llanwnen ===
Llanwnen 1928
Party	Candidate	Votes	%	±%
Independent	Dr Evan Evans*	202		
Liberal	John Evans	153		
Majority		49		
Independent hold		Swing		

=== Llanwenog ===
Llanwenog 1928
Party	Candidate	Votes	%	±%
Liberal	Meredith Ll. Gwarnant Williams**	Unopposed		
Liberal hold		Swing		

=== Lledrod ===
Lledrod 1928
Party	Candidate	Votes	%	±%
Liberal	Richard Daniel Herbert*	Unopposed		
Liberal hold		Swing		

=== Nantcwnlle ===
Nantcwnlle 1928
Party	Candidate	Votes	%	±%
Liberal	Daniel Lewis Herbert*	Unopposed		
Liberal hold		Swing		

=== New Quay ===
New Quay 1928
Party	Candidate	Votes	%	±%
Liberal	Evan James Davies*	Unopposed		
Liberal hold		Swing		

=== Penbryn ===
Penbryn 1928
Party	Candidate	Votes	%	±%
Liberal	John William Lewis*	Unopposed		
Liberal hold		Swing		

=== Strata Florida ===
Strata Florida 1928
Party	Candidate	Votes	%	±%
Liberal	Morgan Jones	251		
Independent	William John Jones	218		
Majority		92		
Liberal gain from Independent		Swing		

=== Taliesin ===
Taliesin 1928
Party	Candidate	Votes	%	±%
Conservative	Audry Dorothy Loxdale Jones*	Unopposed		
Conservative hold		Swing		

=== Talybont ===
Talybont 1928
Party	Candidate	Votes	%	±%
Liberal	Jenkin Evan Evans*	Unopposed		
Liberal hold		Swing		

=== Trefeurig ===
Trefeurig 1928
Party	Candidate	Votes	%	±%
Liberal	David James*	Unopposed		
Liberal hold		Swing		

=== Tregaron ===
Tregaron 1928
Party	Candidate	Votes	%	±%
Liberal	Mary Lloyd*	Unopposed		
Liberal hold		Swing		

=== Troedyraur ===
Troedyraur 1928
Party	Candidate	Votes	%	±%
Liberal	David Evans*	Unopposed		
Liberal hold		Swing		

=== Ysbyty Ystwyth ===
Ysbyty Ystwyth 1928
Party	Candidate	Votes	%	±%
Conservative	Morgan Lloyd Williams*	Unopposed		
Conservative hold		Swing		

== Election of Aldermen ==
Eight aldermen were elected, including the long-serving member, C.M. Williams, who had not faced the electorate for many years and two other retiring aldermen, Josiah T. Jones and Richard Evans who had last fought an election six years previously. Four new aldermen elected at the recent election were elevated while Dr John James had filled a vacancy following the death of J.T. Morgan some years previously. The only retiring alderman who had sought election (Meredith Gwarnant Williams) was not among those appointed for the next six years.

- John Evans, Aberystwyth
- C. M. Williams, Aberystwyth
- Dr J. James, Borth
- D.L. Herbert, Llangeitho
- Simon Davies, Felinfach
- Dr Evan Evans, Lampeter
- Josiah T. Jones, Llandyssul
- Richard Evans, Llangoedmor

== By-elections ==
Five by-elections were held following the election of aldermen. At Tregaron, Mary Lloyd became the first woman elected to Cardiganshire County Council when she was returned unopposed. Dr Evan Jones, who had unsuccessfully stood against Meredith Gwarnant Williams at Llanwenog, was returned unopposed at the by-election. Three wards were contested but no party allegiances were declared.

=== Cilcennin by-election ===
Cilcennin by-election 1922
Party	Candidate	Votes	%	±%
Independent	Evan Felix	258		
Independent	Jenkin Williams	196		
Majority		62		
Independent gain from Liberal		Swing		

=== Llandysul North by-election ===
Llandysul North by-election 1922
Party	Candidate	Votes	%	±%
Independent	Rev E.O. Jenkins	238		
Independent	William Davies	224		
Majority		14		
Independent gain from Liberal		Swing		

=== Llangoedmor by-election ===
Llangoedmor by-election 1922
Party	Candidate	Votes	%	±%
Independent	Evan Davies	464		
Independent	Evan Lewis	204		
Majority		260		
Independent gain from Conservative		Swing		

=== Llanwenog by-election ===
Llanwenog by-election 1922
Party	Candidate	Votes	%	±%
Independent	Dr Evan Jones	Unopposed		
Independent gain from Liberal		Swing		

=== Tregaron by-election ===
Tregaron by-election 1922
Party	Candidate	Votes	%	±%
Independent	Mary Lloyd	Unopposed		
Independent gain from Liberal		Swing		
