= 1919 Cardiganshire County Council election =

1919 Welsh local election

The tenth election for Cardiganshire County Council took place in March 1919. They were preceded by the 1913 election and followed by the 1922 election. No election took place in 1916 due to the First World War.

== Overview of the result ==
Despite the upheaval of the war years the Liberals refined their majority.

== Candidates ==
As in previous elections, there were a large number of unopposed returns. In all 31 members were returned without a contest.

== Gains and losses ==
Very few seats changed hands.

== Contested elections ==
It was stated that the bitterest fights were between candidates of the same political persuasion.

== Retiring aldermen ==
Eight aldermen retired, all of whom were Liberals. Their six-year terms had ended in 1916 but they had been re-appointed in 1916 until fresh elections were held. Two of their number, Lima Jones (elected alderman in 1916 following the death of Morgan Evans) at Aberaeron and E. James Davies at New Quay, contested the election and the former was defeated in one of the surprises of the election. D.C. Roberts, R.J.R. Loxadale and the Rev John Williams were re-elected aldermen but Vaughan Davies, the Rev David Evans and D.L. Jones stood down.

== Division results ==
=== Aberaeron ===
Aberaeron 1919
Party	Candidate	Votes	%	±%
Conservative	Dr D.M. Davies	313		
Liberal	E. Lima Jones**	160		
Majority		153		
Conservative gain from Liberal		Swing		

=== Aberbanc ===
Aberbanc 1913
Party	Candidate	Votes	%	±%
Liberal	Dr W.W. Powell	366		
Liberal	Rev E.J. Davies	325		
Majority		41		
Liberal hold		Swing		

=== Aberporth ===
Aberporth 1919
Party	Candidate	Votes	%	±%
Conservative	B.T. Davies*	unopposed		
Conservative hold		Swing		

=== Aberystwyth Division 1 ===
Aberystwyth Division 1 1919
Party	Candidate	Votes	%	±%
Liberal	Thomas Doughton*	unopposed		
Liberal hold		Swing		

=== Aberystwyth Division 2 ===
Aberystwyth Division 2 1919
Party	Candidate	Votes	%	±%
Liberal	T.J. Samuel	unopposed		
Liberal hold		Swing		

=== Aberystwyth Division 3 ===
Aberystwyth Division 3 1919
Party	Candidate	Votes	%	±%
Independent	John Gibson	270		
Liberal	T.H. Edwards	202		
Majority		68		
Independent hold		Swing		

=== Aberystwyth Division 4 ===
Aberystwyth Division 4 1919
Party	Candidate	Votes	%	±%
Liberal	John Evans*	unopposed		
Liberal hold		Swing		

=== Aeron ===
Aeron 1919
Party	Candidate	Votes	%	±%
Liberal	John Davies*	247		
Conservative	John Price	135		
Majority		112		
Liberal hold		Swing		

=== Borth ===
Borth 1919
Party	Candidate	Votes	%	±%
Liberal	William Morris*	unopposed		
Liberal hold		Swing		

=== Bow Street ===
Bow Street 1919
Party	Candidate	Votes	%	±%
Liberal	Sir Lewes Loveden Pryse	unopposed		
Liberal hold		Swing		

=== Cardigan North ===
Cardigan North 1919
Party	Candidate	Votes	%	±%
Liberal	William Edward Matthews*	Unopposed		
Liberal hold		Swing		

=== Cardigan South ===
Cardigan South 1919
Party	Candidate	Votes	%	±%
Liberal	Dr J.W. Stephens*	unopposed		
Liberal hold		Swing		

=== Cilcennin ===
Cilcennin 1919
Party	Candidate	Votes	%	±%
Liberal	John Jones*	unopposed		
Liberal gain from Conservative		Swing		

=== Cwmrheidol ===
Cwmrheidol 1919
Party	Candidate	Votes	%	±%
Liberal	Rev Charles Evans	unopposed		
Liberal hold		Swing		

=== Devil's Bridge ===
Devil's Bridge 1919
Party	Candidate	Votes	%	±%
Liberal	Rev T. Mason Jones*	unopposed		
Liberal hold		Swing		

=== Felinfach ===
Felinfach 1919
Party	Candidate	Votes	%	±%
Liberal	William Jones	unopposed		
Liberal hold		Swing		

=== Goginan ===
Goginan 1919
Party	Candidate	Votes	%	±%
Liberal	J. Pugh Lewis*	unopposed		
Liberal hold		Swing		

=== Lampeter Borough ===
Lampeter Borough 1919
Party	Candidate	Votes	%	±%
Conservative	J.C. Harford*	unopposed		
Conservative hold		Swing		

=== Llanarth ===
Llanarth 1919
Party	Candidate	Votes	%	±%
Liberal	J.C. Jones	unopposed		
Liberal hold		Swing		

=== Llanbadarn Fawr ===
Llanbadarn Fawr 1919
Party	Candidate	Votes	%	±%
Conservative	Henry Bonsall*	unopposed		
Conservative hold		Swing		

=== Llanddewi Brefi ===
Llanddewi Brefi 1919
Party	Candidate	Votes	%	±%
Conservative	R.S. Rowland*	unopposed		
Conservative hold		Swing		

=== Llandygwydd ===
Llandygwydd 1919
Party	Candidate	Votes	%	±%
Liberal	Thomas Evans*	235		
Labour	David Davies	208		
Majority		27		
Liberal hold		Swing		

=== Llandysul North ===
Llandysul North 1919
Party	Candidate	Votes	%	±%
Liberal	Josiah Richard Jones*	218		
Conservative	William Jones	145		
Majority		73		
Liberal hold		Swing		

=== Llandysul South ===
Llandysul South 1919
Party	Candidate	Votes	%	±%
Liberal	Dr Alfred T. Evans	unopposed		
Liberal hold		Swing		

=== Llansysiliogogo ===
Llansysiliogogo 1919
Party	Candidate	Votes	%	±%
Liberal	Jenkin Davies*	unopposed		
Liberal hold		Swing		

=== Llanfair Clydogau ===
Llanfair Clydogau 1919
Party	Candidate	Votes	%	±%
Liberal	D. Lloyd Lewis	213		
Conservative	Tom Davies	209		
Majority		4		
Liberal gain from Conservative		Swing		

=== Llanfarian ===
Llanfarian 1919
Party	Candidate	Votes	%	±%
Conservative	E.A.L. Powell*	unopposed		
Conservative hold		Swing		

=== Llanfihangel y Creuddyn ===
Llanfihangel y Creuddyn 1919
Party	Candidate	Votes	%	±%
Conservative	Percy Wilkinson*	unopposed		
Conservative hold		Swing		

=== Llangoedmor ===
Llangoedmor 1919
Party	Candidate	Votes	%	±%
Conservative	Richard Evans*	215		
Democrat	E.M. Lewis	174		
Majority		41		
Conservative hold		Swing		

=== Llangeitho ===
Llangeitho 1919
Party	Candidate	Votes	%	±%
Liberal	John Humphreys Davies*	Unopposed	N/A	N/A
Liberal hold				

=== Llangrannog ===
Llangrannog 1919
Party	Candidate	Votes	%	±%
Liberal	Samuel Jones	unopposed		
Liberal hold		Swing		

=== Llanilar ===
Llanilar 1919
Party	Candidate	Votes	%	±%
Liberal	Isaac Jones	167		
Liberal	E.J. Evans*	164		
Majority		3		
Liberal hold		Swing		

=== Llanrhystyd ===
Llanrhystyd 1919
Party	Candidate	Votes	%	±%
Independent	David Lewis	192		
Conservative	D. Morgan James*	157		
Majority		35		
Independent gain from Liberal		Swing		

=== Llanllwchaiarn ===
Llanllwchaiarn 1919
Party	Candidate	Votes	%	±%
Liberal	Rev William Griffiths*	unopposed		
Liberal hold		Swing		

=== Llansantffraed ===
Llansantffraed 1919
Party	Candidate	Votes	%	±%
Liberal	Evan Morris Jones*	236		
Conservative	Evan Morgan	134		
Majority		102		
Liberal hold		Swing		

=== Llanwnen ===
Llanwnen 1919
Party	Candidate	Votes	%	±%
Liberal	John Jones*	148		
Liberal	Evan Evans	121		
Majority		27		
Liberal hold		Swing		

=== Llanwenog ===
Llanwenog 1919
Party	Candidate	Votes	%	±%
Liberal	Meredith Ll. Gwarnant Williams	259		
Conservative	Herbert Davies-Evans jnr.*	257		
Liberal gain from Conservative		Swing		

=== Lledrod ===
Lledrod 1919
Party	Candidate	Votes	%	±%
Liberal	Rev T.R. Morgan*	unopposed		
Liberal hold		Swing		

=== Nantcwnlle ===
Nantcwnlle 1919
Party	Candidate	Votes	%	±%
Liberal	Daniel Lewis Herbert*	Unopposed		
Liberal hold		Swing		

=== New Quay ===
New Quay 1919
Party	Candidate	Votes	%	±%
Liberal	Evan James Davies**	unopposed		
Liberal hold		Swing		

=== Penbryn ===
Penbryn 1919
Party	Candidate	Votes	%	±%
Liberal	Griffith Davies*	unopposed		
Liberal hold		Swing		

=== Strata Florida ===
Strata Florida 1919
Party	Candidate	Votes	%	±%
Conservative	Dr John Morgan	unopposed		
Conservative hold		Swing		

=== Taliesin ===
Taliesin 1919
Party	Candidate	Votes	%	±%
Conservative	Dr John James*	unopposed		
Conservative hold		Swing		

=== Talybont ===
Talybont 1919
Party	Candidate	Votes	%	±%
Liberal	Jenkin Evan Evans*	Unopposed		
Liberal hold		Swing		

=== Trefeurig ===
Trefeurig 1919
Party	Candidate	Votes	%	±%
Liberal	Richard Evans*	unopposed		
Liberal hold		Swing		

=== Tregaron ===
Tregaron 1919
Party	Candidate	Votes	%	±%
Liberal	D. J. Williams*	unopposed		
Liberal hold		Swing		

=== Troedyraur ===
Troedyraur 1919
Party	Candidate	Votes	%	±%
Liberal	Thomas Davies	unopposed		
Liberal hold		Swing		

=== Ysbyty Ystwyth ===
Ysbyty Ystwyth 1913
Party	Candidate	Votes	%	±%
Liberal	T. Morgan*	unopposed		
Liberal hold		Swing		

== Election of Aldermen ==
Seven of the eight retiring aldermen were Liberals, and the new aldermen reflected the same political balance. No elected councillors were elected as aldermen so no by-elections were required for the first time in the history of the council.

The following five retiring aldermen were re-elected:

- D.C. Roberts, Liberal
- R.J.R. Loxdale, Liberal (retiring alderman, from outside Council - did not seek election)
- Rev John Williams (retiring alderman, from outside Council - did not seek election)
- E. Lima Jones, Liberal

In addition, the following four new aldermen were elected:

- R.S. Rowland, Conservative
- Griffith Davies, Liberal
- Rev William Griffiths, Liberal
- Rev T. Mason Jones, Liberal

One retiring aldermen was elected as councillor but not re-elected as alderman:

- E. James Davies, New Quay

Only one retiring alderman was not re-elected having retired from county politics:

- Matthew Vaughan Davies
- Rev David Evans
- D.L. Jones
