= 1913 Cardiganshire County Council election =

1913 Welsh local election

The ninth election for Cardiganshire County Council took place in March 1913. They were preceded by the 1910 election and followed by the 1919 election as no election took place in 1916 due to the First World War.

== Overview of the result ==
As in previous elections, there was a Liberal majority.

== Candidates ==
As in previous elections, there were a large number of unopposed returns, including all four seats at Aberystwyth. In all 31 members were returned without a contest.

Two of the eight retiring aldermen stood as candidates, namely David Davies at Llanwnwen and William J. Lloyd (who was returned unopposed) at Nantcwnlle.

== Outcome ==
Very few seats changed hands.

== Division results ==
=== Aberaeron ===
Aberaeron 1913
Party	Candidate	Votes	%	±%
Liberal	E. Lima Jones**	unopposed		
Liberal hold		Swing		

=== Aberbanc ===
Aberbanc 1913
Party	Candidate	Votes	%	±%
Liberal	William Jeremy*	unopposed		
Liberal hold		Swing		

=== Aberporth ===
Aberporth 1913
Party	Candidate	Votes	%	±%
Conservative	B.T. Davies	118		
Liberal	J. Williams	80		
Majority		38		
Conservative gain from Liberal		Swing		

=== Aberystwyth Division 1 ===
Aberystwyth Division 1 1913
Party	Candidate	Votes	%	±%
Liberal	Thomas Doughton	unopposed		
Liberal hold		Swing		

=== Aberystwyth Division 2 ===
Aberystwyth Division 2 1913
Party	Candidate	Votes	%	±%
Liberal	D.C. Roberts*	unopposed		
Liberal hold		Swing		

=== Aberystwyth Division 3 ===
Aberystwyth Division 3 1913
Party	Candidate	Votes	%	±%
Liberal	Robert Ellis*	unopposed		
Liberal hold		Swing		

=== Aberystwyth Division 4 ===
Aberystwyth Division 4 1913
Party	Candidate	Votes	%	±%
Liberal	John Evans	Unopposed		
Liberal gain from Conservative		Swing		

=== Aeron ===
Aeron 1913
Party	Candidate	Votes	%	±%
Liberal	John Morgan Howell*	159		
Conservative	Thomas Jenkins	144		
Majority		15		
Liberal hold		Swing		

=== Borth ===
Borth 1913
Party	Candidate	Votes	%	±%
Liberal	William Morris*	unopposed		
Liberal hold		Swing		

=== Bow Street ===
Bow Street 1913
Party	Candidate	Votes	%	±%
Conservative	Sir Edward Pryse*	unopposed		
Conservative hold		Swing		

=== Cardigan North ===
Cardigan North 1913
Party	Candidate	Votes	%	±%
Liberal	R.W. Matthews	Unopposed		
Liberal hold		Swing		

=== Cardigan South ===
Cardigan South 1913
Party	Candidate	Votes	%	±%
Liberal	Dr J.W. Stephens*	unopposed		
Liberal hold		Swing		

=== Cilcennin ===
Cilcennin 1913
Party	Candidate	Votes	%	±%
Liberal	John Jone*	unopposed		
Liberal hold		Swing		

=== Cwmrheidol ===
Cwmrheidol 1913
Party	Candidate	Votes	%	±%
Liberal	William Evans	86		
Liberal	W.S. Davies	58		
Majority		28		
Liberal hold		Swing		

=== Devil's Bridge ===
Devil's Bridge 1913
Party	Candidate	Votes	%	±%
Liberal	Rev T. Mason Jones*	unopposed		
Liberal hold		Swing		

=== Felinfach ===
Felinfach 1913
Party	Candidate	Votes	%	±%
Liberal	John Jones	Unopposed		
Liberal hold		Swing		

=== Goginan ===
Goginan 1913
Party	Candidate	Votes	%	±%
Liberal	J. Pugh Lewis*	unopposed		
Liberal hold		Swing		

=== Lampeter Borough ===
Lampeter Borough 1913
Party	Candidate	Votes	%	±%
Conservative	J.C. Harford*	unopposed		
Conservative hold		Swing		

=== Llanarth ===
Llanarth 1913
Party	Candidate	Votes	%	±%
Liberal	J.C. Jones*	unopposed		
Liberal hold		Swing		

=== Llanbadarn Fawr ===
Llanbadarn Fawr 1913
Party	Candidate	Votes	%	±%
Conservative	J.J. Bonsall*	unopposed		
Conservative hold		Swing		

=== Llanddewi Brefi ===
Llanddewi Brefi 1910
Party	Candidate	Votes	%	±%
Conservative	R.S. Rowland*	unopposed		
Conservative hold		Swing		

=== Llandygwydd ===
Llandygwydd 1910
Party	Candidate	Votes	%	±%
Liberal	Thomas Evans, Llwyndyrus	165		
Liberal	Thomas Evans, Rhoswen	133		
Majority		32		
Liberal hold		Swing		

=== Llandysul North ===
Llandysul North 1913
Party	Candidate	Votes	%	±%
Liberal	Josiah Richard Jones*	Unopposed		
Liberal hold		Swing		

=== Llandysul South ===
Llandysul South 1913
Party	Candidate	Votes	%	±%
Liberal	Thomas Davies*	Unopposed		
Liberal hold		Swing		

=== Llandysiliogogo ===
Llandysiliogogo 1913
Party	Candidate	Votes	%	±%
Liberal	Jenkin Davies*	unopposed		
Liberal hold		Swing		

=== Llanfair Clydogau ===
Llanfair Clydogau 1913
Party	Candidate	Votes	%	±%
Conservative	Joseph Evans	149		
Liberal	John Watkin Davies*	133		
Majority		16		
Conservative gain from Liberal		Swing		

=== Llanfarian ===
Llanfarian 1913
Party	Candidate	Votes	%	±%
Conservative	E.A.L. Powell*	unopposed		
Conservative hold		Swing		

=== Llanfihangel y Creuddyn ===
Llanfihangel y Creuddyn 1913
Party	Candidate	Votes	%	±%
Liberal	William Evans*	unopposed		
Liberal hold		Swing		

=== Llangoedmor ===
Llangoedmor 1913
Party	Candidate	Votes	%	±%
Liberal	Richard Evans*	unopposed		
Liberal hold		Swing		

=== Llangeitho ===
Llangeitho 1913
Party	Candidate	Votes	%	±%
Liberal	J.H. Davies*	unopposed		
Liberal hold		Swing		

=== Llangrannog ===
Llangrannog 1913
Party	Candidate	Votes	%	±%
Liberal	C. Evans	100		
Liberal	T. Jones	63		
Majority		37		
Liberal hold		Swing		

=== Llanilar ===
Llanilar 1913
Party	Candidate	Votes	%	±%
Liberal	E.J. Evans*	140		
Liberal	Isaac Jones	103		
Majority		37		
Liberal hold		Swing		

=== Llanrhystyd ===
Llanrhystyd 1913
Party	Candidate	Votes	%	±%
Liberal	David Davies	148		
Conservative	D. Morgan James*	120		
Majority		28		
Liberal gain from Conservative		Swing		

=== Llanllwchaiarn ===
Llanllwchaiarn 1913
Party	Candidate	Votes	%	±%
Liberal	Rev William Griffiths*	unopposed		
Liberal hold		Swing		

=== Llansantffraed ===
Llansantffraed 1913
Party	Candidate	Votes	%	±%
Liberal	Evan Morris Jones	119		
Conservative	Evan Morgan	115		
Majority		4		
Liberal hold		Swing		

=== Llanwnen ===
Llanwnen 1913
Party	Candidate	Votes	%	±%
Liberal	David Evans**	98		
Liberal	John Jones	92		
Majority		6		
Liberal gain from Conservative		Swing		

=== Llanwenog ===
Llanwenog 1913
Party	Candidate	Votes	%	±%
Liberal	Herbert Davies-Evans jnr.*	unopposed		
Conservative gain from Liberal		Swing		

=== Lledrod ===
Lledrod 1913
Party	Candidate	Votes	%	±%
Liberal	Rev T.R. Morgan*	unopposed		
Liberal hold		Swing		

=== Nantcwnlle ===
Nantcwnlle 1913
Party	Candidate	Votes	%	±%
Liberal	William J. Lloyd**	Unopposed		
Liberal hold		Swing		

=== New Quay ===
New Quay 1913
Party	Candidate	Votes	%	±%
Liberal	Jenkin Thomas	unopposed		
Liberal hold		Swing		

=== Penbryn ===
Penbryn 1913
Party	Candidate	Votes	%	±%
Liberal	Griffith Davies*	140		
Liberal	Thomas Jones	108		
Majority		32		
Liberal hold		Swing		

=== Strata Florida ===
Strata Florida 1913
Party	Candidate	Votes	%	±%
Conservative	Dr Morgan	152		
Liberal	David Jenkins	103		
Majority		49		
Conservative gain from Liberal		Swing		

=== Taliesin ===
Taliesin 1913
Party	Candidate	Votes	%	±%
Liberal	Dr John James*	unopposed		
Liberal hold		Swing		

=== Talybont ===
Talybont 1913
Party	Candidate	Votes	%	±%
Liberal	William Rees	unopposed		
Liberal hold		Swing		

=== Trefeurig ===
Trefeurig 1913
Party	Candidate	Votes	%	±%
Liberal	Peter Jones*	unopposed		
Liberal hold		Swing		

=== Tregaron ===
Tregaron 1913
Party	Candidate	Votes	%	±%
Liberal	D. J. Williams*	unopposed		
Liberal hold		Swing		

=== Troedyraur ===
Troedyraur 1913
Party	Candidate	Votes	%	±%
Liberal	Thomas Davies	194		
Liberal	David Davies	162		
Majority		32		
Liberal hold		Swing		

=== Ysbyty Ystwyth ===
Ysbyty Ystwyth 1913
Party	Candidate	Votes	%	±%
Liberal	Thomas Morgan*	unopposed		
Liberal hold		Swing		

== Election of aldermen ==
All eight retiring aldermen were Liberals. At the statutory meeting, the vacancies were likewise all filled by Liberals. Of those elected, J.T. Morgan had not faced an electoral contest for many years and was made chair of the council.

The following five retiring aldermen were re-elected:

- James James, Llanrhystud
- J.T. Morgan, Talybont
- James Stephens, Llechryd (who had filled a vacancy)
- Rev T. Arthur Thomas, Llandysul
- C.M. Williams, Aberystwyth

In addition, the following three new aldermen were elected:

- J.W. Davies, defeated candidate at Llangybi
- J.M. Howell, elected member at Aberaeron
- Thomas Morgan, elected member at Ysbyty Ystwyth

Two retiring aldermen were elected as councillors but were not re-elected as aldermen:

- David Evans, Ffynonfair, Llanwnen
- W.J. Lloyd, Nantcwnlle

Only one retiring alderman was not re-elected having retired from county politics:

- E.J. Price, Morfa Mawr, Llanon

== 1913 by-elections following the election of aldermen ==
Two by-elections were held. John Davies, Feather Hotel, Aberaeron was returned unopposed for the seat vacated by J.M. Howell. At Ysbyty Ystwyth, Morris Davies, agent to the Hafod estate, gained a seat for the Conservatives.

=== Aeron by-election ===
Aeron by-election 1913
Party	Candidate	Votes	%	±%
Liberal	John Davies	Unopposed		
Liberal hold		Swing		

=== Ysbyty Ystwyth by-election ===
Ysbyty Ystwyth by-election 1913
Party	Candidate	Votes	%	±%
Conservative	J.G. Morris Davies	97		
Liberal	Samuel Edwards	59		
Majority		38		
Conservative gain from Liberal		Swing		
