= All Saints' Church, Cellan =

All Saints' Church
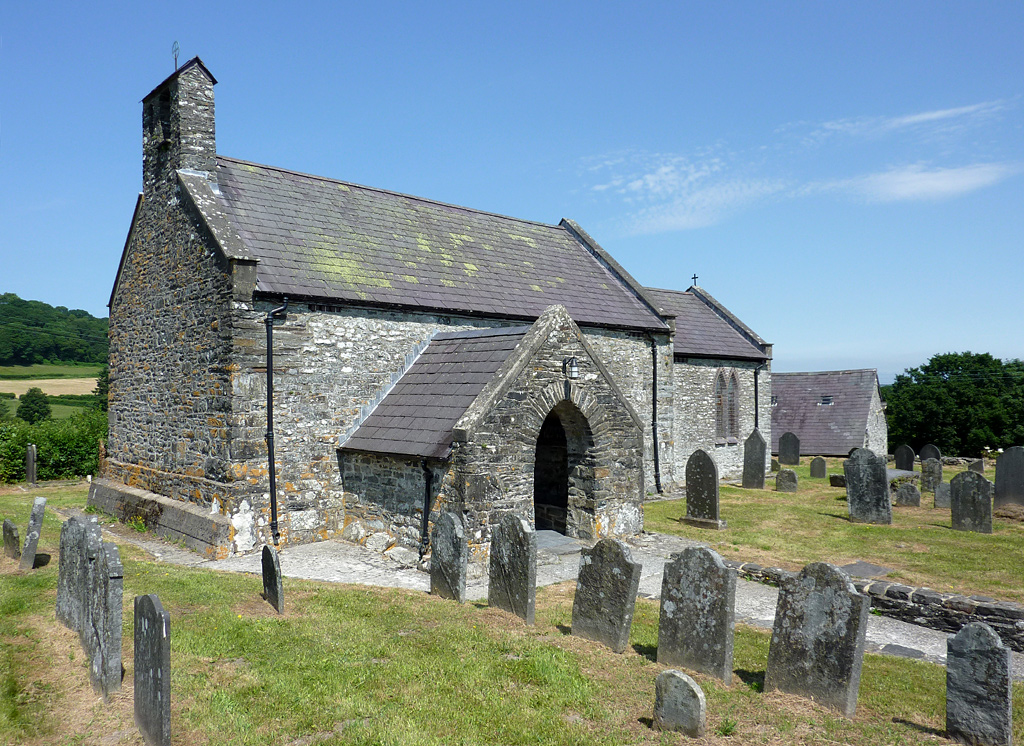
- All Saints' Church (2013)
- All Saints' Church
- Location: Cellan, Llanfair Clydogau
- Country: Wales
- Denomination: Church in Wales

Architecture
- Heritage designation: Grade II*
- Designated: 6 March 1964
- Architectural type: Medieval

Administration
- Diocese: St Davids
- Archdeaconry: Cardigan

All Saints' Church, in Cellan is a Church in Wales parish church. Cellan is 3 miles (5 km) northeast of Lampeter, Wales. The church is a Grade II* listed building with part of it dating back to the medieval period. It belongs to the United Benefice of Lampeter.

== History ==
All Saints' Church was built during the thirteenth or fourteenth centuries, possibly on top of a Bronze Age barrow, and is thought to have originally been dedicated to Saint Callwen. Another of its medieval features is its square-bowled font. The building has been subjected to minor changes throughout history, including several restorations. Its roof, once thatched, was replaced by slate in the seventeenth century. The presence of a medieval rood loft was recorded in 1810, but has since been removed - perhaps during the Victorian restoration of 1861–62.

== Description ==
The church is constructed of rubble stone and has a slate roof. It consists of a nave and chancel, both thought to date to the thirteenth or fourteenth centuries, a west bellcote by Herbert Luck North, a north vestry and south porch. Its interior has been described as "the only significant Arts and Crafts work in the county [of Ceredigion]." The ceilings - dating to North's restoration of 1908 - are boarded and painted white, and decorated with flowers and vines, with a symbolic lamb painted on the chancel ceiling.

== Heritage funding ==
All Saints' Church received a Heritage Lottery Fund grant in 2018 in order to fund essential repairs to the building.
