= Pant-gwyn, Ceredigion =

Village in Ceredigion, Wales

Coordinates: 52.084268°N 4.569283°W

Pant-gwyn
- Location within Ceredigion
- OS grid reference: SN 2405 4599
  - Cardiff: 72.8 mi (117.2 km)
  - London: 193.9 mi (312.1 km)
- Community: Llangoedmor
- Principal area: Ceredigion
- Country: Wales
- Sovereign state: United Kingdom
- Post town: Cardigan
- Postcode district: SA43
- Police: Dyfed-Powys
- Fire: Mid and West Wales
- Ambulance: Welsh
- UK Parliament: Ceredigion Preseli
- Senedd Cymru – Welsh Parliament: Ceredigion Penfro

Pant-gwyn is a small village in the community of Llangoedmor, Ceredigion, Wales, which is 72.8 miles (117.1 km) from Cardiff and 193.9 miles (312.1 km) from London. Pant-gwyn is represented in the Senedd by Elin Jones (Plaid Cymru) and the Member of Parliament is Ben Lake (Plaid Cymru).

== See also ==
- List of localities in Wales by population
