= Neuadd Wilym =

Village in Ceredigion, Wales

Coordinates: 52.072440°N 4.621752°W

- Location within Ceredigion
- OS grid reference: SN 2041 4481
  - Cardiff: 74.2 mi (119.4 km)
  - London: 196 mi (315 km)
- Community: Llangoedmor
- Principal area: Ceredigion
- Country: Wales
- Sovereign state: United Kingdom
- Post town: Cardigan
- Postcode district: SA43
- Police: Dyfed-Powys
- Fire: Mid and West Wales
- Ambulance: Welsh
- UK Parliament: Ceredigion Preseli
- Senedd Cymru – Welsh Parliament: Ceredigion

Neuadd Wilym is a small village in the community of Llangoedmor, Ceredigion, Wales, which is 74.2 miles (119.4 km) from Cardiff and 196 miles (315.4 km) from London. Neuadd Wilym is represented in the Senedd by Elin Jones (Plaid Cymru) and is part of the Ceredigion Preseli constituency in the House of Commons.

== See also ==
- List of localities in Wales by population
