= Llanfihangel y Creuddyn =

Ancient parish in Ceredigion, Wales

Coordinates: 52.369939°N 3.961772°W

Llanfihangel y Creuddyn: Welsh: Llanfihangel-y-Creuddyn
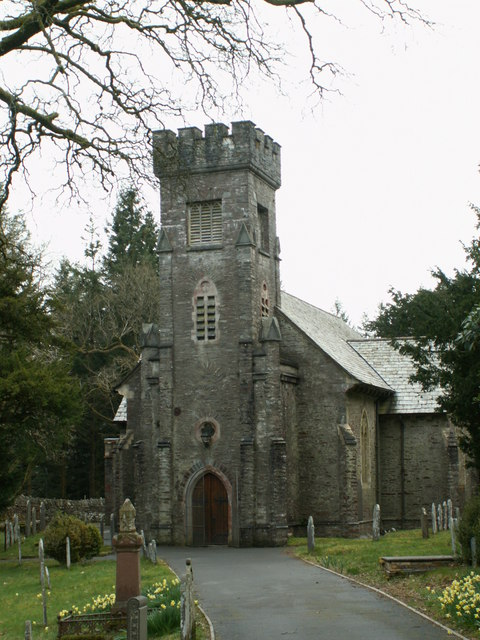
- Saint Michael's church is the focal point of the old Hafod estate that lies within the parish.

- Location within Ceredigion
- OS grid reference: SN6676
  - Cardiff: 90 mi (140 km)SE
- Principal area: Ceredigion
- Preserved county: Dyfed
- Country: Wales
- Sovereign state: United Kingdom
- Post town: ABERYSTWYTH
- Postcode district: SY23
- Dialling code: 01974
- Police: Dyfed-Powys
- Fire: Mid and West Wales
- Ambulance: Welsh
- UK Parliament: Ceredigion Preseli
- Senedd Cymru – Welsh Parliament: Ceredigion Penfro

Llanfihangel y Creuddyn (Welsh: [ɬanvɪˈhaŋɛl ɨ ˈkrɛɨðɨn], also spelt Llanfihangel-y-Creuddyn) is an ancient parish in the upper division of the hundred of Ilar, Ceredigion, West Wales, 7 miles south east from Aberystwyth, on the road to Rhayader, comprising the chapelry of Eglwys Newydd, or Llanfihangel y Creuddyn Uchaf, and the township of Llanfihangel y Creuddyn Isaf. It was also known as Lower Llanfihangel y Creuddyn, Lower Llanfihangel y Croyddin and Lower Llanfihangel y Croyddyn. This parish is situated on the rivers Ystwyth, Mynach and Rheidol and intersected by various other streams. An ancient parish was a village or group of villages or hamlets and the adjacent lands. Originally they held ecclesiastical functions, but from the sixteenth century onwards they also acquired civil roles. The parish may have been established as an ecclesiastical parish. Originally a medieval administrative unit, after 1597 ecclesiastical units acquired civil functions with the Elizabethan Poor Laws, which made the parishes responsible for welfare. The civil function was exercised through vestry meetings which administered the Poor Law and were responsible for local roads and bridges.

== History ==
The lands of the parish were part of the Cistercian Abbey of Strata Florida originally established in 1164. After the Dissolution of the monasteries by Henry VIII (1536–1540) during the English Reformation, their holdings were divided and awarded to new tenants at the direction of the 1st Earl of Essex. Some of the Strata Florida lands were granted to the Herbert family, who came to Cardiganshire during the reign of Elizabeth I. One, Sir Richard Herbert of Pengelly and Cwmystwyth was High Sheriff of Cardiganshire from 22 November 1542.

A rent roll dated 1540 for the granges of Mefenydd, Cwmystwyth and Hafodwen (‘newe leases’) reveals that W[illia]m Herbert and Morgan Herbert were tenants of several properties formerly belonging to the Abbey of Strata Florida, including significantly: Havodychdryd Ceilliau Pantycrave Bwlch Gwalter parcell of Ty Loge [...] 4 parte of Pwll Piran parte of Pregnant and Blaenmerin and Alltgron Havodychdryd or Hafod Uchtryd is the name of the house and demesne and the other properties.

Llanfihangel is one of 53 villages in England and Wales (one of three in Wales) whose menfolk suffered no deaths during World War I. Collectively they are known as the Thankful Villages. It is also one of 14 villages that were "doubly thankful", in that it also lost no service personnel during World War II. The village is featured on Darren Hayman's album, Thankful Villages Volume 3.

== Present day ==
Trawsgoed is the modern community name. Llanfihangel translates as the church of St. Michael (Welsh: Mihangel). The parish lies within the Cistercian Way. The area is now sparsely populated with only a few towns and villages such as Ysbyty Ystwyth, Cwmystwyth, Pont-rhyd-y-groes, Llanilar and Llanfair. In the past area was relatively densely populated due to its mineral wealth. Silver, lead and zinc have been mined in the valley since Roman times, an activity that reached its peak in the 18th century. The largest of the very many mines was Cwmystwyth Mines.

Within the boundaries of the parish lies the village of Llanfihangel-y-Creuddyn, the Hafod Estate and Devil's Bridge. The linguistic (Welsh language dialects) border between North and South is officially held to be a line east–west passing through the public house Y Ffarmers (see Gallery) in the centre of the village.

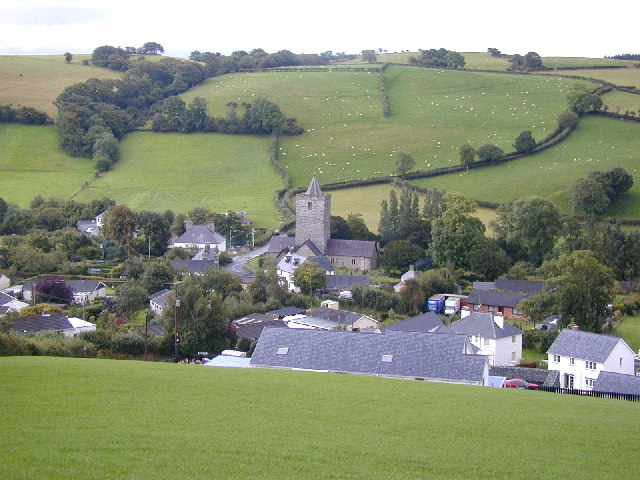
Llanfihangel y Creuddyn viewed from the north.

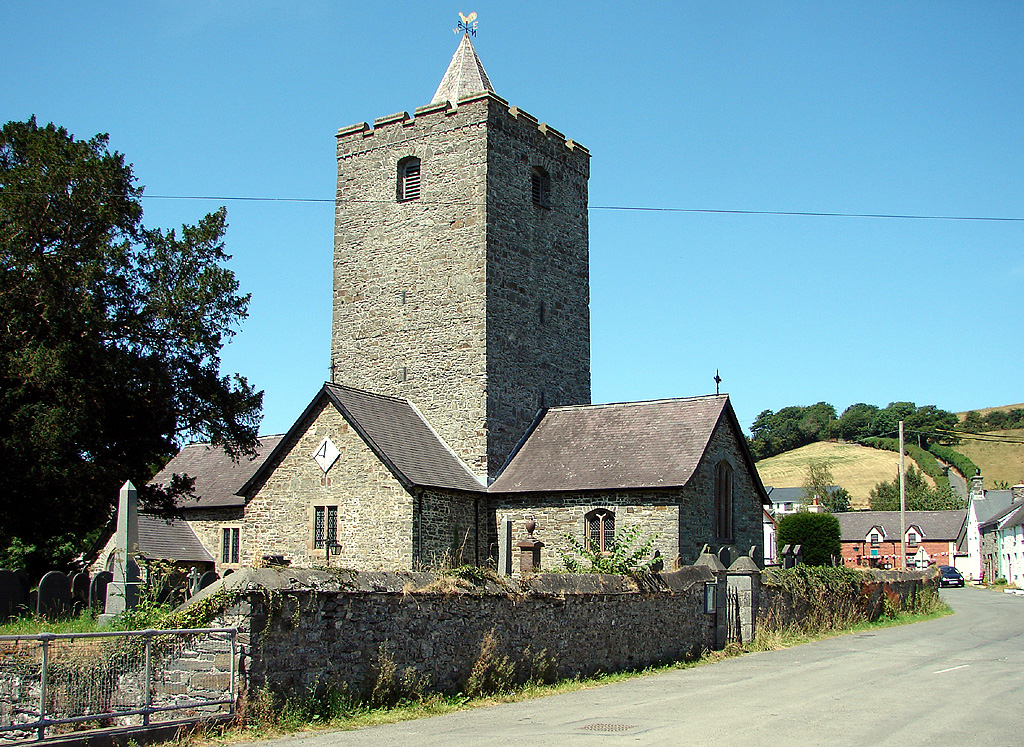
Parish Church, Llanfihangel y Creuddyn.

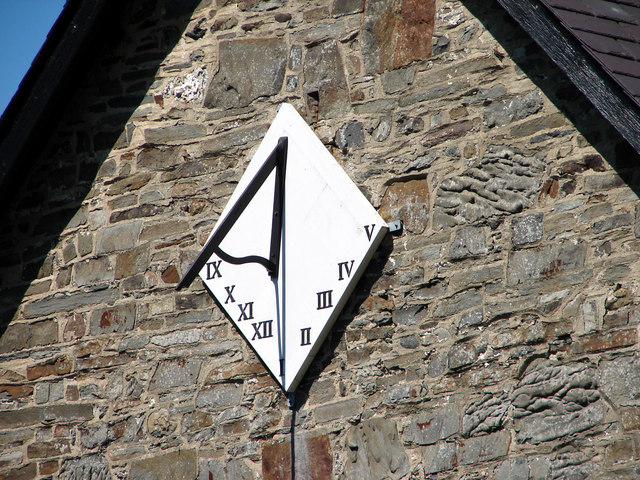
Close-up of the sundial on Llanfihangel y Creuddyn church.

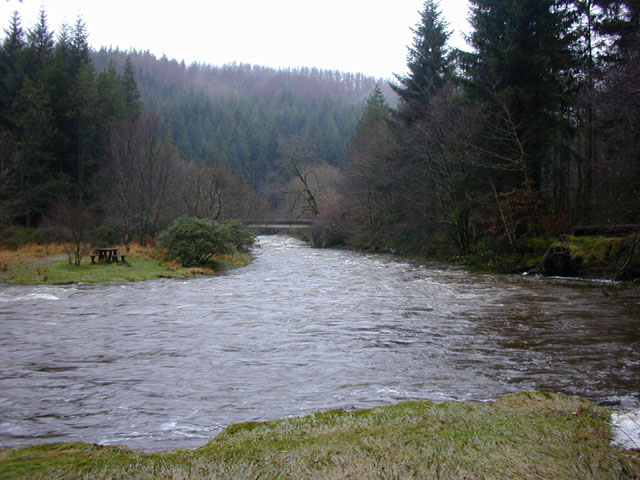
River Ystwyth in spate at the Hafod Estate

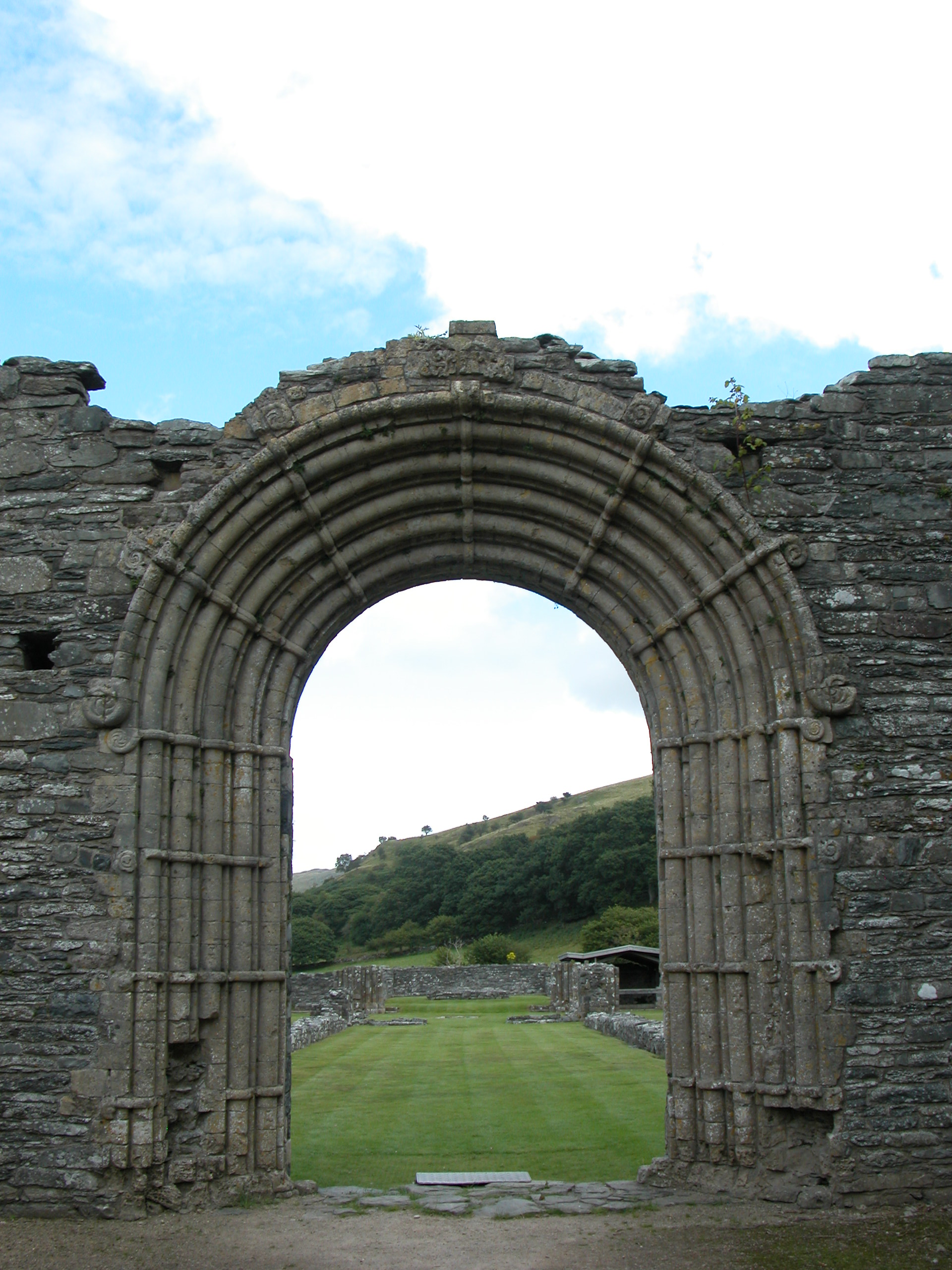
Strata Florida

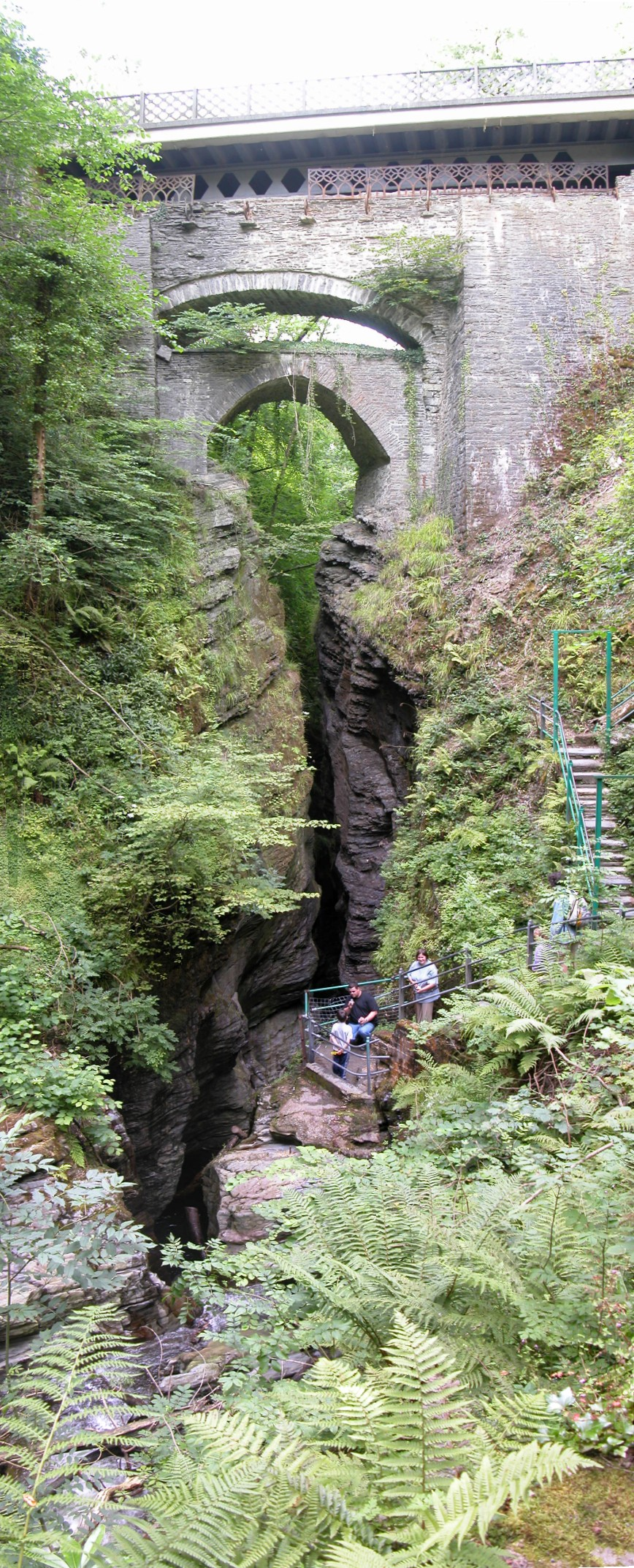
Jacob's Ladder, Devil's Bridge, Ceredigion.

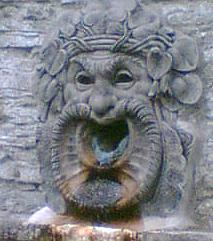
Fountain mask at the Hafod Estate

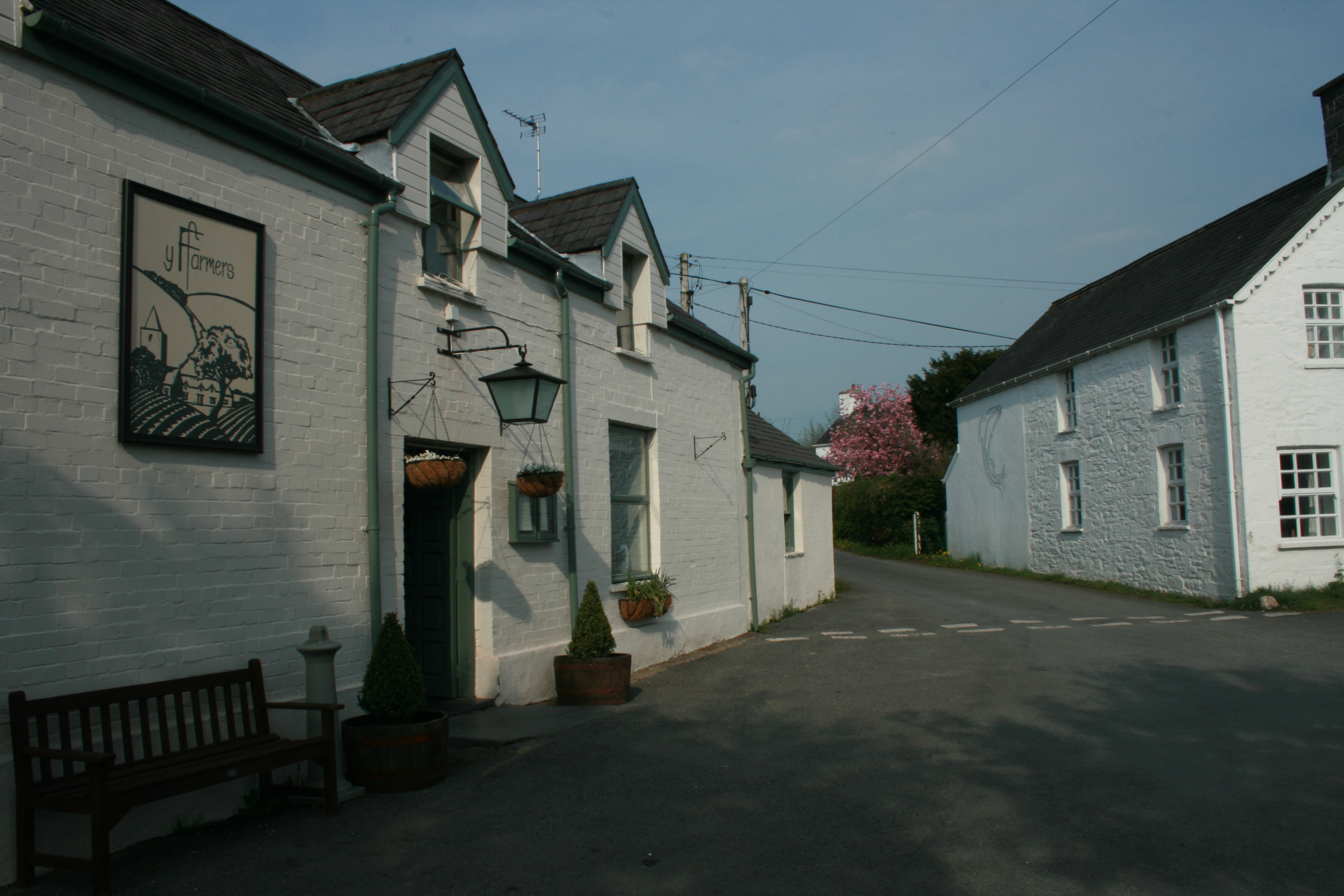
Y Ffarmers (the Farmers Arms) pub in Llanfihangel y Creuddyn.

== In popular culture ==
- In the 1999 historical drama Solomon and Gaenor, Gaenor's parents are said to have come from Llanfihangel y Creuddyn, and some of the film's later scenes are set there.
