= Tre-Taliesin =

Village in Ceredigion, Wales

Coordinates: 52.5°N 3.983333°W

Tre-Taliesin: Welsh: Tre Taliesin
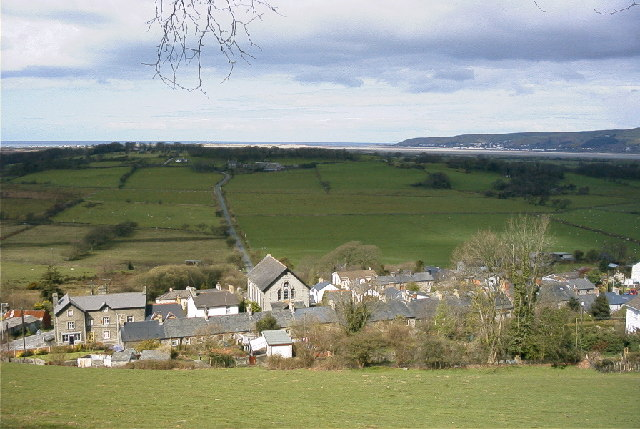
- Tre Taliesin and Ynys Cynfelyn

- Location within Ceredigion
- Principal area: Ceredigion
- Country: Wales
- Sovereign state: United Kingdom
- Post town: Machynlleth
- Police: Dyfed-Powys
- Fire: Mid and West Wales
- Ambulance: Welsh
- UK Parliament: Ceredigion Preseli

Tre-Taliesin is a village in Ceredigion, Wales, on the A487 road, 9 miles north of Aberystwyth and 9 miles south of Machynlleth. It is in the parish of Llangynfelyn.

The village is known for the Bedd Taliesin, a hilltop Bronze Age tumulus which is traditionally regarded as the site for the grave of the Welsh bard, Taliesin. A manuscript in the hand of 18th century literary forgerer Iolo Morganwg claimed he was the son of Saint Henwg of Llanhennock but this is contrary to every other fact and tradition. It is listed as a Historic Monument. It is a round-kerb cairn with a cist about 2m long. The capstone has fallen; the side stone slabs are more or less in their original positions.

The cairn has no proven connection with the historical Taliesin, a 6th-century poet esteemed by the poets of medieval Wales as the founder of the Welsh poetic tradition whose surviving work includes praise poems to the rulers of the early Welsh kingdom of Powys and Rheged, in the Hen Ogledd (modern northern England/southern Scotland). He became a figure of legend in medieval Wales and his association with Elffin ap Gwyddno, son of the king of the fabled Cantre'r Gwaelod, off the coast of Ceredigion, may account for the monument's name.

The village was established in the 1820s, when a number of houses were built on former common land that had been sold to fund the drainage of Cors Fochno. The village then further expanded in the 1860s to house the families of miners working in the lead mines in the area. Prior to the building in the 1820s there were only a few scattered houses along the turnpike road, and the settlement was known as 'Tafarn Fach' (Small Tavern) - the story locally was that the new name was chosen as a more respectable one, given the religious sensibilities of the time.

The village includes a chapel (Rehoboth) and a community hall (Llanfach). The village primary school (Ysgol Llangynfelyn) was closed by Ceredigion Council in 2016.

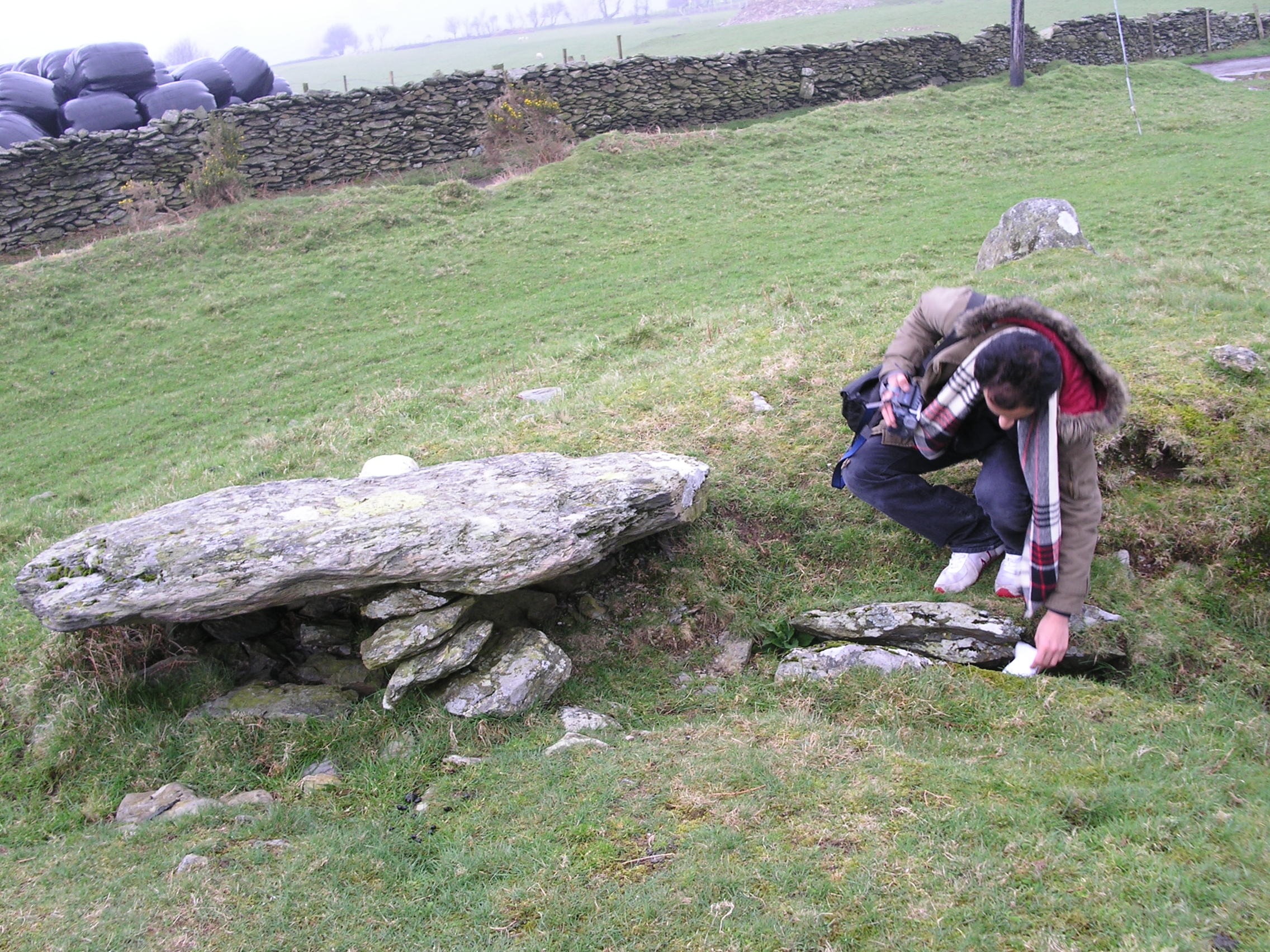
Bedd Taliesin
