= Llansantffraid, Ceredigion =

Village in Ceredigion, Wales

Coordinates: 52.285°N 4.183°W

Llansantffraid
- Village and community
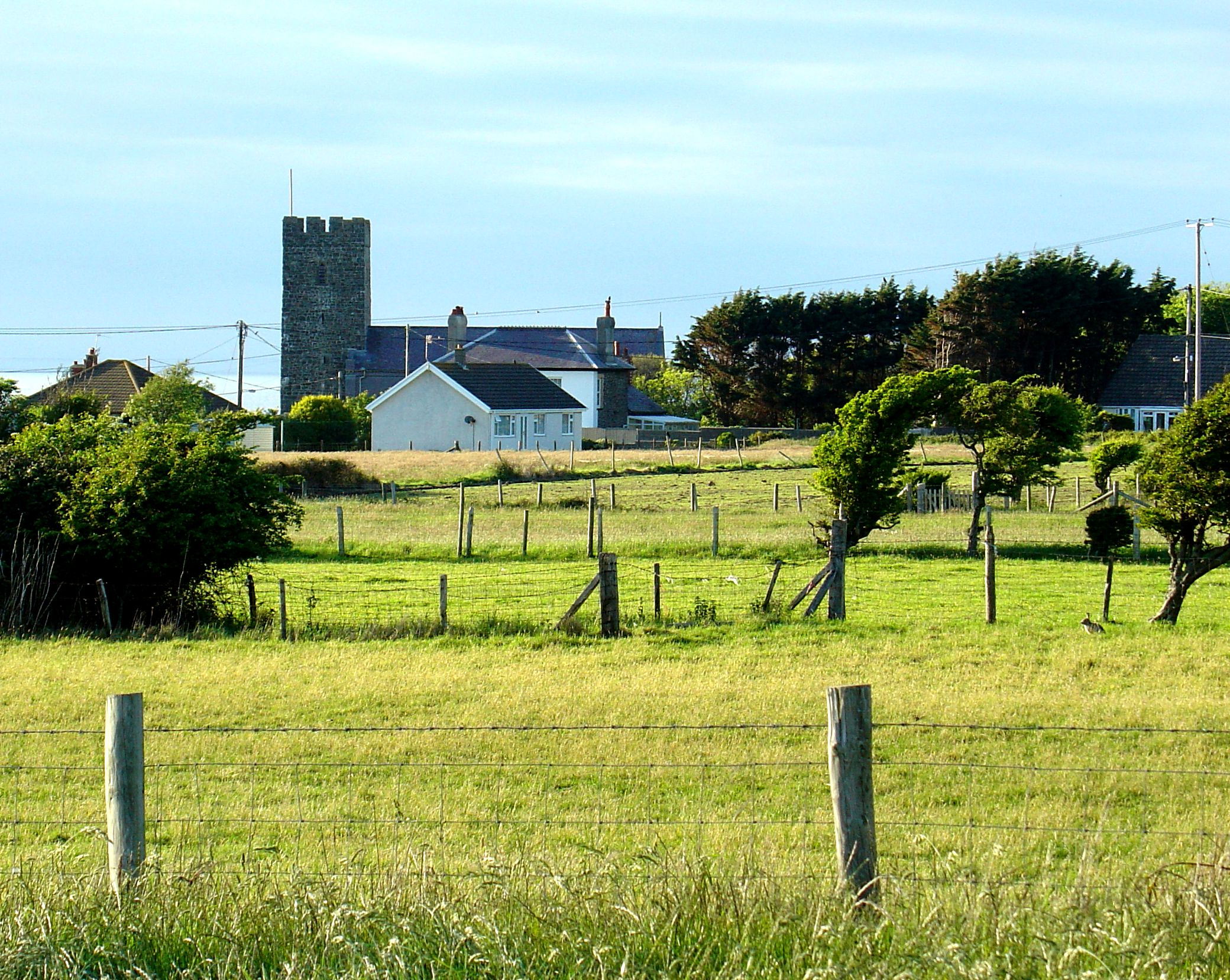
- The parish church of St Ffraed

- Location within Ceredigion
- Principal area: Ceredigion
- Country: Wales
- Sovereign state: United Kingdom
- Police: Dyfed-Powys
- Fire: Mid and West Wales
- Ambulance: Welsh
- List of places UK Wales Ceredigion Community map: Map of the community

Llansantffraid, or Llansantffraed (Welsh: Llansanffraid), is a small rural village and community and practically merged with the village of Llanon just west of the main A487 coastal road between Aberaeron and Aberystwyth, about 11 mi (18 km) from Aberystwyth. The population in 2001 was 1,241, declining to 1,212 at the 2011 census.

The parish church of St Ffraed dates from the 15th century and is a Grade II* listed building.

== Governance ==
An electoral ward with the same name exists. This ward stretches inland with a total population of 2,386.

There is also a community council with the same name that covers a smaller part of the electoral ward that has ten members sitting. It is due to be next elected in May 2017.
