= Llangoedmor =

Village and community in Ceredigion, Wales

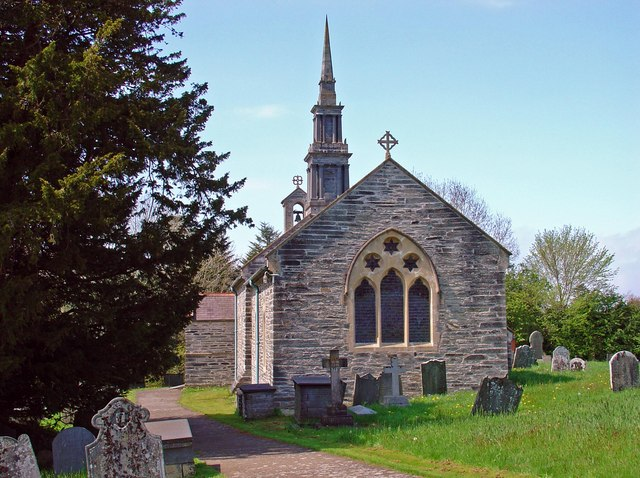
- Llangoedmor Parish Church

- Location within Ceredigion
- Population: 1,128 (2011)
- OS grid reference: SN175465
- Principal area: Ceredigion
- Preserved county: Dyfed
- Country: Wales
- Sovereign state: United Kingdom
- Post town: CARDIGAN
- Postcode district: SA43
- Dialling code: 01239
- Police: Dyfed-Powys
- Fire: Mid and West Wales
- Ambulance: Welsh
- UK Parliament: Ceredigion Preseli
- Senedd Cymru – Welsh Parliament: Ceredigion Penfro
- List of places UK Wales Ceredigion 52.08112°N 4.6326°W Community map: Map of the community

Llangoedmor is a village and community in Ceredigion, Wales. The village is 2 miles east of Cardigan, while the community also encompasses Llechryd, Pant-gwyn, and Neuadd Wilym.

Llangoedmor (Welsh for 'the church the great wood') is derived from the groves of Welsh Oak and other trees which existed there. The remnants of the woodland still exist and are now a site of Special Scientific Interest, this wood is known locally as Cwm Du.

In the Early Middle Ages it was the home of St Cynllo, whose knee imprints are said to exist in a rock, near the farm named Felin Gynllo. His feast day is 17 July. A sparsely populated area, it is mainly made up of farmsteads, the occasional mansion, such as Coedmore and Plas Llangoedmor, and detached houses. The Croes-y-Llan area has seen the most recent building activity in the last two decades, and has seen an increase in the population of this village, especially by those from cities who have moved from urban conurbations.

Llangoedmor was the site of a 12th-century battle. Samuel Lewis's A Topographical Dictionary of Wales (1833) states:

"Soon after the death of Henry I, a memorable battle was fought near Crûg Mawr, a conical hill in this parish, between the Welsh, commanded by Gruffudd ap Rhys and the English, in which the latter sustained a signal defeat."

These days, Llangoedmor is a popular spot for tourists, partly because of its proximity to the Preseli Hills and Pembrokeshire Coast National Park. The parish church of St Cynllo is a grade II* listed building.
