= Ysbyty Ystwyth =

Village in Ceredigion, Wales

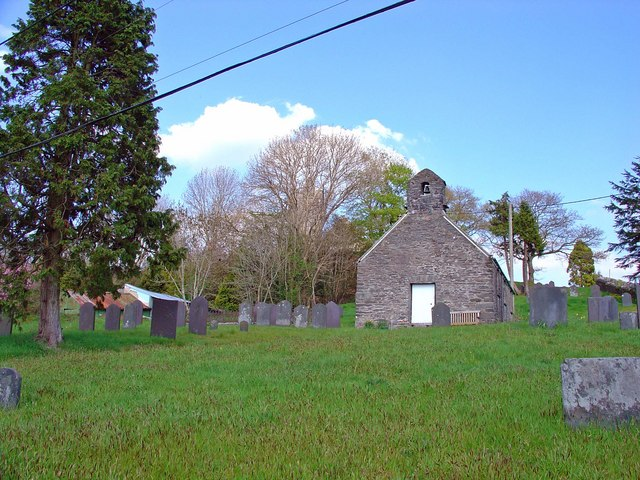
- This is the original parish church of Ystbyty Ystwyth.

- Location within Ceredigion
- Population: 409 (2011)
- OS grid reference: SN7371
  - Cardiff: 90 mi (140 km)SE
- Principal area: Ceredigion
- Preserved county: Dyfed
- Country: Wales
- Sovereign state: United Kingdom
- Post town: YSTRAD MEURIG
- Postcode district: SY25
- Dialling code: 01974
- Police: Dyfed-Powys
- Fire: Mid and West Wales
- Ambulance: Welsh
- UK Parliament: Ceredigion Preseli
- Senedd Cymru – Welsh Parliament: Ceredigion Penfro
- List of places UK Wales Ceredigion 52.326800°N 3.862652°W Community map: Map of the community

Ysbyty Ystwyth (Welsh pronunciation: [əsˈbəti ˈəstʊi̯θ]) is a small village and community in Ceredigion, Wales, 11 mi (18 km) southeast of Aberystwyth. Its church and the parish of the same name were the property of the Order of the Knights of the Hospital of St John of Jerusalem, hence the 'Ysbyty' in the title (Welsh for "hospital"), which never was (despite local belief) a hospice for travellers to Strata Florida. The community includes the hamlet Pont-rhyd-y-groes. The area is situated in the Desert of Wales and is wild country. The peak of Llan Ddu Fawr is located in the area and the lakes Llyn Fyrddon Fawr and Fach.
