= Llanfair Clydogau =

Village and community in Ceredigion, Wales

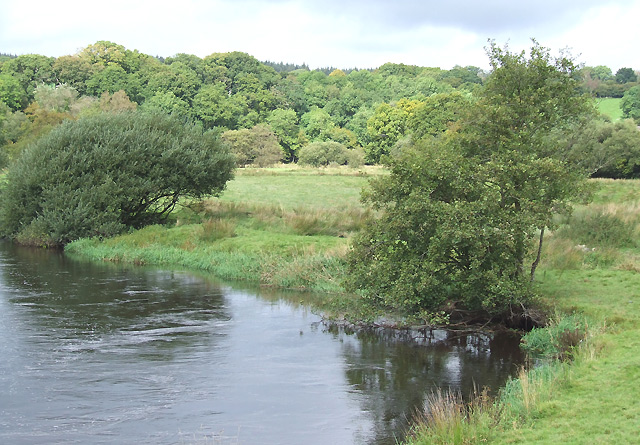
- Afon Teifi at Llanfair Clydogau, Ceredigion

- Location within Ceredigion
- OS grid reference: SN622514
  - Cardiff: 90 mi (140 km)SE
- Principal area: Ceredigion
- Preserved county: Dyfed
- Country: Wales
- Sovereign state: United Kingdom
- Post town: Lampeter
- Postcode district: SA48
- Dialling code: 01570
- Police: Dyfed-Powys
- Fire: Mid and West Wales
- Ambulance: Welsh
- UK Parliament: Ceredigion Preseli
- Senedd Cymru – Welsh Parliament: Ceredigion Penfro
- List of places UK Wales Ceredigion 52.143405°N 4.013852°W Community map: Map of the community

Llanfair Clydogau is a small village and community encompassing 3,232 hectares (7,990 acres), located about 4 miles (6.4 km) north-east of Lampeter on the B4343 road, in Ceredigion, Wales. It has a population of 634 as of the 2011 UK census, 87.5% of whom are Welsh-speaking, yet only 46% were born in Wales?. Formerly located within the hundred of Moyddyn.

The community is located at the southernmost area of Ceredigion's former lead and silver mines, which until the 1760s were highly productive. Clydogau refers to the River Clydogau or Clywedogau as it was originally spelt. The meaning of "clywedog" is audible, or noisy. The basins of Clywedog-isaf, Clywedog-ganol and Clywedog-uchaf are nearby. The community includes the hamlet of Cellan.

There are two churches still in regular use, Saint Mary's Parish Church and the Welsh Independent Capel Mair, built in 1825, which is a Grade II listed building. Both churches have recently received improvements.

== Notable people ==
- John Thomas (1838–1905), a Welsh photographer of landscape images of Wales and Welsh chapels. He was born at Glanrhyd.
- Local native and scholar G. J. Williams, (1892–1962), the first president of Yr Academi Gymreig (Welsh Academy).
- John Metcalf (born 1946), a Welsh-Canadian composer; settled here in 1991 in an energy-saving house built from reclaimed materials
