= Rhosllanerchrugog Welsh =

Dialect of Welsh

- Cymraeg Rhos (Welsh)
- Region: Rhosllanerchrugog
- Native speakers: ~10,000 (~40% of Rhosllanerchrugog)
- Language family: Indo-European: Celtic; Insular Celtic; Brittonic; Western Brittonic; Welsh; Rhosllanerchrugog Welsh
- Early forms: Common Brittonic: Old Welsh; Middle Welsh
- Writing system: Latin Script (Welsh orthography)

Language codes
- ISO 639-3: –
- Glottolog: None

Rhosllanerchrugog Welsh, also known simply as Rhos Welsh (Welsh: Cymraeg Rhos), is a dialect of the Welsh language spoken in Rhosllanerchrugog in Wrexham. It has been stated to be spoken by 40% of the residents of Rhosllanerchrugog. Census records suggest figures are lower although still above the national average; the 2001 Census showed that 31.5% of the community area was Welsh speaking, declining to 24% at the 2011 census. The dialect is notable for its relatively low level of intelligability with other Welsh dialects. Some recordings of the dialect exist in Amgueddfa Cymru.

== Features ==
The dialect's features are partly a result of immigration to Rhos early in its growth as a mining village: unlike in other villages in the region, most of the immigrants came from Welsh-speaking upland agricultural areas in West Wales, giving the village a distinct linguistic identity. Some features are, however, shared with other northern dialects, such as Powyseg and Gwyndodeg; the final [v] and [ð] is lost in words such as araf ('slow'), here pronounced ['ara], and the word ffordd ('road') being pronounced as [fɔr].

The dialect also displays numerous distinctive consonants and examples of metathesis. Examples are amcan ('aim, notion'), rendered in Rhos as ['ankam], or ['borðə] for standard ['boðrɔ], boddro ('to bother').

Vowels also differ widely from modern standard Welsh: one of its key features is the diphthongisation of vowels [e] and [o], as seen in the vowel of the name Rhos, locally [r̥əus]. Another typical feature is the contraction of verbal phrases, so that for example Yr oedd gennyf ('I had') is rendered as ['ogai] and Mae'n rhaid i mi ('I have to') as ['haimi].

The Rhos dialect is also known for a unique vocabulary. The main example is a word that has become synonymous with the village: the demonstrative adjective nene (pronounced approximately [neːneː]), meaning 'that', or more specifically 'that over there'. While the related forms ene ('that') and dene ('there is') are found in other parts of North-East Wales, nene is specific to Rhos. Another typical feature shared with other north-eastern forms of Welsh is use of the dialectal dôl ('ago, back, in return') in place of Standard Welsh ôl. These features are to an extent becoming lost in younger speakers under the influence of Welsh medium education, with younger speakers in Welsh schools showing a particular bias against dialectal nene in favour of standard hwnna or hynny.
