= Trychrug =

Mountain in Ceredigion, Wales

Coordinates: 52.218°N 4.134°W

Trychrug is a mountain in Ceredigion, Wales, which rises to 343 metres (1,125 ft) high (above sea level) at SN542599 to the north of the valley of the River Aeron and south of the valley of the Afon Wyre.

It rises gently from the surrounding land and is farmed almost to the summit which is given over to coniferous forestry plantations. It is crossed, almost at the summit by an ancient drovers road now classified as the B4337 road which gave access from the northern parts of Ceredigion to South Wales before the coastal route down to Aberaeron was developed. Evidence of past use as a drovers road comes from some of the names of the farms adjoining the road such as Llundain East (East London in English).

The route crossed the Afon Wyre at the old ford at Llanrhystud, passed over Trychrug before descending to the River Aeron and the crossing at Talsarn before continuing on to Lampeter.
