= COFI =

Cofi or COFI may refer to:

== Organisations ==
- Church of Ireland (C of I), Irish province of Anglicanism
- College of Idaho (C of I), Caldwell, Idaho, US
- UN Food and Agriculture Organization's Committee on Fisheries (CoFi)
- Council of Forest Industries, Canada's largest lumber manufacturing group

== Other uses ==
- a Cofi, someone from Caernarfon, a town in Wales (colloquial demonymic usage)
  - Cofi dialect/accent of the Welsh language
- Cost of funds index (COFI), in banking
- Conduct of Financial Institutions (CoFI), legislative requirements relating to New Zealand financial institutions
- Cofi, a character in the American animated web series Chikn Nuggit
