= Dyfedeg =

Dialect of Welsh spoken in south west Wales

Dyfedeg or Y Ddyfedeg is one of the four traditional dialects of the Welsh language. Spoken in south-west Wales, the language takes its name from the Iron Age tribe the Demetae, who would also give their name to the post-Roman Kingdom of Dyfed.

Writing in 1900, John Rhŷs and David Brynmor Jones referred to the dialect as "Demetian" and noted it was "closely connected" to the neighboring Gwenhwyseg, or "Silurian Welsh". The writers also give a boundary for the dialect as "northwards, as far as the stream of Wyrai at Llanrhystud".

Today, many of the communities with the highest numbers of Welsh speakers are found in the traditional area for Ddyfedeg. As such, it is one of the most common forms of Welsh spoken today. The dialect (along with Gwenhwyseg and Powyseg) also forms a major constituent part of the wider "Southwalian dialect".

== See also ==
- Landsker Line
