= Demetae =

Iron Age and Roman-era Celtic people in southwest Wales

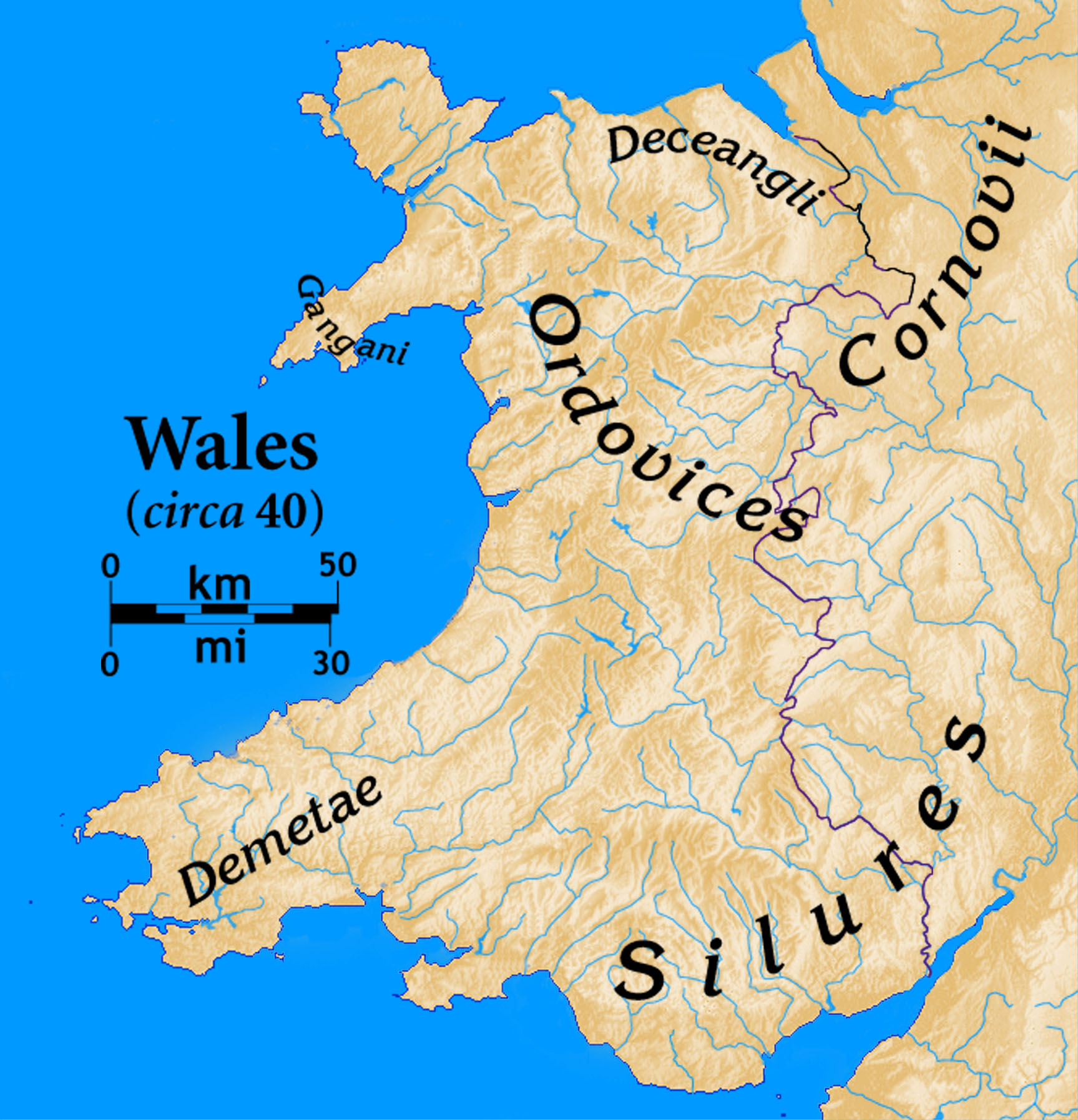
Tribes of Wales at the time of the Roman invasion. The modern Anglo-Welsh border is also shown, for reference purposes.

The Demetae were a Celtic people of Iron Age and Roman period, who inhabited modern Pembrokeshire and Carmarthenshire in south-west Wales. The tribe also gave their name to the medieval Kingdom of Dyfed, the modern area and county of Dyfed and the distinct dialect of Welsh spoken in modern south-west Wales, Dyfedeg.

== Etymology and relationship to Dyfed ==
The tribal name Demetae is thought to derive from a Common Celtic element related to the modern Welsh word defaid (sheep) as well as the Ancient Brythonic word defod (wealth, property or riches). This element persists in the name for the area of West Wales that the tribe inhabited, with the post-Roman Kingdom of Dyfed (proto-Celtic *dametos) a clear continuation of the Pre-Roman etymon. The name even survived the Norman conquest of Wales and the introduction of the Shire system, with Thomas Morgan noting that the Welsh inhabitants of Pembrokeshire still referred to the area as Dyfed in the nineteenth century.

This etymology is supported by the tribal area being especially noted for the cultivation of sheep, from which the Demetae would have generated much of their wealth. Even in the modern era, etymologists and antiquarians such as William Baxter noted the names Dyfed and Demetae derived as "a country fit for the pasture of sheep" and that the local people were noted for their cultivation of large numbers of sheep and goats from ancient times.

== History ==
The Demetae are mentioned in Ptolemy's Geographia, as being west of the Silures. He mentions two of their towns, Moridunum (modern Carmarthen) and Luentinum (identified as the Dolaucothi Gold Mines near Pumsaint, Carmarthenshire). They are not mentioned in Tacitus' accounts of Roman warfare in Wales, which concentrate on their neighbours the Silures and Ordovices.

Vortiporius, "tyrant of the Demetae", is one of the kings condemned by Gildas in his 6th century polemic De Excidio et Conquestu Britanniae. This probably signifies the sub-Roman petty kingdom of Dyfed.
