= Powyseg =

Dialect of Welsh

Powyseg (or Powysian; Welsh: Powyseg or y Bowyseg) is a dialect of the Welsh language spoken in the central areas of Wales. It is one of the four major dialects of Welsh spoken in the United Kingdom. Its usage is most predominantly found within northern Powys county in Wales and Wroxeter (Welsh: Caer Guricon) in England.

The dialect follows neighbouring Dyfedeg Welsh in its writing and speaking. Northern Welsh variants are known to have vocabulary and literary differences from Standard Welsh, for example llefrith (Dyfedeg and Powyseg) and llaeth (Gwenhwyseg and Gwyndodeg), both meaning 'milk' in English, with one being more standard in the north, and the other in the south. Shetin meaning hedge is another word unique to Powyseg, compared to the northern (gwrych), western (clawdd), Pembrokeshire (claw) and Gwenhwyseg (perth) terms for hedge. Powyseg and Gwyndodeg also use the term llwynog for fox compared to the southern word cadno.

John Morris-Jones stated in 1913, that Powyseg was one of the four dialectal areas in Wales, with the dialect covering Northern Mid Wales and North East Wales. While in the 1900 book The Welsh People, John Rhŷs and David Brynmor-Jones stated the dialect was one of the three dialects of Wales (Gwenhwyseg and Ddefedeg, were grouped together as the 'Southwalian dialect'), and Powyseg was centred on Montgomeryshire but had since expanded to the Merionethshire coast from the River Dyfi (Dovey) to Dolgellau and Harlech. The dialect was claimed by the two to have been spread by Cunedda Wledig.
