= Afon Wyre =

River in Ceredigion, Wales

Afon Wyre River Wyre
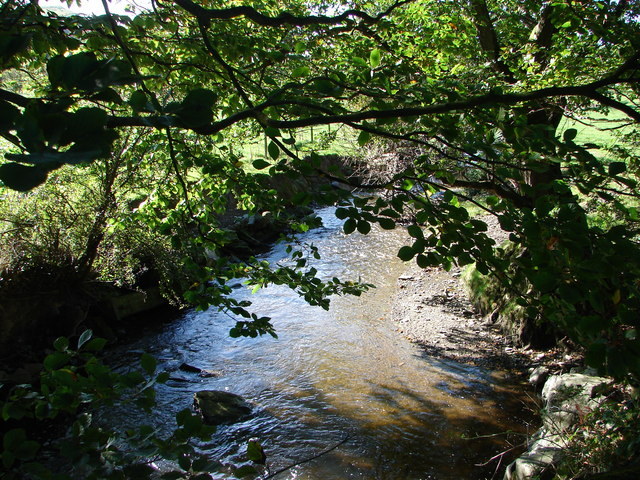
- Afon Wyre at Tyncoed

- Location of the mouth in Wales

Location
- Sovereign state: United Kingdom
- Country: Wales
- Principal area: Ceredigion

Physical characteristics
- Mouth
  - coordinates: 52°18′21.26″N 4°9′42.71″W

Afon Wyre (Welsh for 'River Wyre'; Welsh pronunciation: [ˈʊɨ̯rɛ], also called Afon Wyre Fawr, meaning 'great Wyre', and formerly Gwyrai) is a small river in Ceredigion, Wales.

The river runs north from its source for about 1.5 miles (2.4 km), through Lledrod, and then turns west for the bulk of its course, about 8 miles (13 km), passing through Llangwyryfon and Llanrhystud (where it is joined by Wyre Fach ('little Wyre') and Carrog) before emptying into Cardigan Bay.
