= Welsh Braille =

Braille system for Welsh

- Script type: alphabet
- Print basis: Welsh alphabet
- Languages: Welsh

Related scripts
- Parent systems: Braille: English Braille; Welsh Braille

Welsh Braille is the braille alphabet of the Welsh language. Except for ⠡ ch and ⠹ th, print digraphs in the Welsh alphabet are digraphs in braille as well:

⠙⠙ dd, ⠋⠋ ff, ⠝⠛ ng, ⠇⠇ ll, ⠏⠓ ph, ⠗⠓ rh.

Accents are rendered with circumflex ⠈, diaeresis ⠘, grave ⠆, acute ⠒.

Welsh Braille also has a number of contractions. Punctuation is as in English Braille.
