= Welsh orthography =

Rules for writing the Welsh language

Welsh orthography uses 29 letters (including eight digraphs) of the Latin script to write native Welsh words as well as established loanwords.

Majuscule forms (also called uppercase or capital letters)
A	B	C	CH	D	DD	E	F	FF	G	NG	H	I	J	L	LL	M	N	O	P	PH	R	RH	S	T	TH	U	W	Y
Titlecase forms
A	B	C	Ch	D	Dd	E	F	Ff	G	Ng	H	I	J	L	Ll	M	N	O	P	Ph	R	Rh	S	T	Th	U	W	Y
Minuscule forms (also called lowercase or small letters)
a	b	c	ch	d	dd	e	f	ff	g	ng	h	i	j	l	ll	m	n	o	p	ph	r	rh	s	t	th	u	w	y

The traditional names of the letters are a, bi, èc, èch, di, èdd, e, èf, èff, èg, èng, aets, i, je, èl, èll, èm, èn, o, pi, ffi (yff), èr, rhi, ès, ti, èth, u, w, y. In South Wales, where the letters i and u are pronounced identically, they are distinguished as i-dot and u-bedol (bedol means "horseshoe"). Thus the television channel S4C is pronounced ès pedwar èc. Informally, another way of saying the letters is often used, adding the sound [ɘ] after stop consonants and simply pronouncing the others: a, by, cy, ch, dy, dd, and so on.

In a Welsh dictionary, the Welsh order of letters is strictly observed, so that cyngor 'council' is found before cyhyrog 'muscular', and lori 'lorry' is found before llaeth 'milk'.

Welsh orthography makes use of multiple diacritics, which are primarily used on vowels, namely the acute accent (acen ddyrchafedig), the grave accent (acen ddisgynedig), the circumflex (acen grom, to bach, or hirnod) and the diaeresis (didolnod). They are considered variants of their base letter, i.e. they are not alphabetised separately. The Welsh alphabet also makes no use of ⟨K⟩ (ce, [keː]), ⟨Q⟩ (ciw, [kɪu̯]), ⟨V⟩ (fi, [viː]), ⟨X⟩ (ecs, [ɛks]), and ⟨Z⟩ (sèd, [sɛd]/[zɛd]).

== Foreign words ==
Welsh borrows a number of words from English. Those words are spelled according to Welsh spelling conventions, for example: bws "bus", bwc "buck", bwced "bucket", car "car", nogin "noggin", gob "gob", slogan "slogan", fflanel "flannel", trwnt "truant", and gêl/geol/jael/jêl/siêl "gaol".

=== Non-native letters in Welsh ===
The letter ⟨j⟩ has only recently entered into Welsh orthography, but is still debated: for newly borrowed words from English which retain the /dʒ/ sound, even when it was not originally spelled ⟨j⟩ in English, as in garej ("garage"), jiráff ("giraffe"), and ffrij ("fridge"), although often these words have Welsh equivalences or are spelt without ⟨j⟩ such as modurdy ("garage"), siráff ("giraffe"), and oergell ("fridge"). Older borrowings of English words containing /dʒ/ resulted in the sound being pronounced and spelled in various other ways, most commonly approximated by ⟨si⟩ with the /ʃ/ sound as in Siapan ("Japan"), and siaced ("jacket"). (Note: While the International Rugby Club uses the term "Siapan" in Welsh, sources such as Yr Atlas Cymraeg Newydd and the Welsh Wikipedia use the term "Japan".)

The letters ⟨k, q, v, x, z⟩ are not part of the Welsh Alphabet. However, these letters are used in foreign proper names and their derivatives: Kantaidd, Zwinglïaidd. They are also sometimes used in technical and other specialized terms, like kilogram, queer, volt, taxi, and zero, but in all cases can be, and often are, nativised: cilogram, cwiar, folt, tacsi and sero.

== History ==
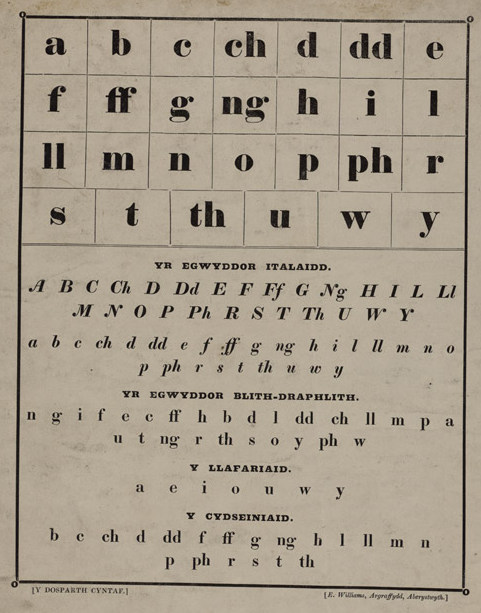
A 19th-century Welsh alphabet printed in Welsh, without ⟨j⟩ or ⟨rh⟩

The earliest samples of written Welsh date from the 6th century and are in the Latin alphabet (see Old Welsh). The orthography differs from that of modern Welsh, particularly in the use of ⟨p, t, c⟩ to represent the voiced plosives /b, d, ɡ/ non initially. Similarly, the voiced fricatives /v, ð/ were written ⟨b, d⟩.

By the Middle Welsh period, this had given way to quite a bit of variability: Although ⟨b, d, g⟩ were now used to represent /b, d, ɡ/, these sounds were also often written as in Old Welsh, while /v/ could be denoted by ⟨u, v, ỽ, f, w⟩. In earlier manuscripts, moreover, fricatives were often not distinguished from plosives (e.g. ⟨t⟩ for /θ/, now written ⟨th⟩). The grapheme ⟨k⟩ was also used, unlike in the modern alphabet, particularly before front vowels. The disuse of this letter is at least partly due to the publication of William Salesbury's Welsh New Testament and William Morgan's Welsh Bible, whose English printers, with type letter frequencies set for English and Latin, did not have enough ⟨k⟩ letters in their type cases to spell every /k/ as ⟨k⟩, so the order went "C for K, because the printers have not so many as the Welsh requireth"; this was not liked at the time, but has become standard usage.

In this period, ⟨ð⟩ (capital ⟨Ð⟩) was also used interchangeably with ⟨dd⟩, such as the passage in the 1567 New Testament: A Dyw y sych ymaith yr oll ðeigre oddiwrth y llygeid, which contains both ⟨ð⟩ and ⟨dd⟩. Elsewhere, the same word is spelt in different ways, e.g. newydd and newyð.

The printer and publisher Lewis Jones, one of the co-founders of Y Wladfa, the Welsh-speaking settlement in Patagonia, favoured a limited spelling reform which replaced Welsh ⟨f⟩ /v/ and ⟨ff⟩ /f/ with ⟨v⟩ and ⟨f⟩, and from circa 1866 to 1886 Jones employed this innovation in a number of newspapers and periodicals he published and/or edited in the colony. However, the only real relic of this practice today is the Patagonian placename Trevelin ("mill town"), which in standard Welsh orthography would be Trefelin.

In 1928, a committee chaired by Sir John Morris-Jones standardised the orthography of modern Welsh.

In 1987, a committee chaired by Professor Stephen J. Williams made further small changes, introducing ⟨j⟩. Not all modern writers adhere to the conventions established by these committees.

== Letter names and sound values ==
"N" and "S" indicate variants specific to the northern and southern dialects of Welsh. Throughout Wales, an alternative system is also in use, in which all consonant letters are named using the corresponding consonant sound plus a schwa (e.g. cy /kə/ for èc). In this system the vowels are named as below.

Letter	Name	Corresponding sounds	English approximation
a	a	/a, ɑː, a:/	father (long)
b	bi	/b/	bat
c	èc	/k/	case
ch	èch	/χ/	No English equivalent; similar to loch in Scots, but pronounced further back.
d (Note: The sequence si indicates /ʃ/ when followed by a vowel; similarly, di and ti sometimes indicate /dʒ/ and /tʃ/ respectively when followed by a vowel, although these sounds are spelled j and ts in loanwords like jẁg "jug" and wats "watch".)	di	/d/	day
dd	èdd	/ð/	these
e	e	/ɛ, eː/	bed (short) / closest to hey (long)
f	èf	/v/	violet
ff	èff	/f/	four
g	èg	/ɡ/	gate
ng	èng	/ŋ/	thing
h (Note: In addition to representing the phoneme /h/, h indicates voicelessness in the graphemes mh, nh, and ngh.)	aets	/h/	hat
i	i, i dot (S)	/ɪ, iː, j/	bit (short) / machine (long) / yes (as consonant; before vowels)
j	je	/d͡ʒ/	jump (only found in loanwords, usually from English but still in wide use such as jeli ('jelly', IPA: [dʒɛlɪ]) and jîns ('jeans', IPA: [dʒɪnz])
l	èl	/l/	lad
ll	èll	/ɬ/	not present in English; a voiceless alveolar lateral fricative. A bit like what the consonant cluster "hl" would sound like.
m	èm	/m/	mat
n	èn	/n/	net
o	o	/ɔ, oː/	Short, like "bog" in RP; long like dawn in RP or stove in Scottish English
p	pi	/p/	pet
ph (Note: The digraph ph – which indicates the aspirate mutation of p (e.g. ei phen-ôl) – may also be found very occasionally in words derived from Greek (e.g. Pharo), although most words of Greek origin are spelt with ff (e.g. ffotograff).)	ffi	/f/	phone
r	èr	/r/	Rolled R
rh	rhi	/r̥/	Voiceless rolled R
s	ès	/s/	sat
t	ti	/t/	stick
th	èth	/θ/	thin
u	u (N), u bedol (S)	/ɨ̞, ɨː/ (N), (Note: In the North, the letters u and y are occasionally pronounced /ɪ, iː/, the same as in the South, rather than /ɨ̞, ɨː/. This is usually the case when the preceding vowel is /ɪ/ or when y is preceded or followed by g /ɡ/ or followed by w /u/, forming a diphthong."Morffoleg y Gymraeg". Geiriadur yr Academi. Bangor University.) /ɪ, iː/ (S)	for Southern variants: bit (short) / machine (long); in Northern dialects /ɨ̞, ɨː/ not found in English. Identical to "î" and "â" in Romanian, and similar to the "e" in English roses.
w	w	/ʊ, uː, w/	push (short) / pool (long) / wet (glide)
y (Note: The vowel letter y indicates /ə/ in unstressed monosyllabic words (e.g. y "the", fy "my") or non-final syllables (regardless of whether these are stressed or not), but /ɨ̞, ɨː/ (N) or /ɪ, iː/ (S) in word-final syllables (again, regardless of stress).)	ỳ	/ɨ̞, ɨː, ə/ (N), /ɪ, iː, ə/ /əː/ (S)	for Southern variants: bit (final syllable, short) / machine (final syllable, long) above (other places, short) / roses /ɨ̞, ɨː/, found in certain dialects of English that differentiate "Rosa's" and "roses", for example, General American.

=== Diphthongs ===
Orthography	Northern dialects	Southern dialects	English (approximation only)
ae	/ɑːɨ̯/ (Note: final or only syllable, e.g. chwarae, caeth)	/ai̯/	eye
ae	/eːɨ̯/ (Note: non-final syllable. e.g. chwaraewr, caethwas)	/ɛi̯/	may
ai	/ai̯/	/ai̯/	eye
au	/aɨ̯/, /a/	/ai̯/, /ɛ/	eye. Realised as cat (north) and bet (south) in plural endings.
aw	/au̯, ɑːu̯/	/au̯/	how
ei	/ɛi̯/	/ɛi̯/	As in eight.
eu	/əɨ̯/	/əi̯/	As in height.
ew	/ɛu̯, eːu̯/	/ɛu̯/	Roughly like Edward with the d removed: E'ward, or Cockney pronunciation of -ell in words like well, hell.
ey	/e.ɨ̯/	/e.ɪ/	Two distinct vowels.
iw	/ɪu̯/	/ɪu̯/	Similar to Cockney pronunciation of -ill in words like bill, fill.
oe	/ɔɨ̯, ɔːɨ̯/	/ɔi̯/	boy
oi	/ɔi̯/	/ɔi̯/	boy
ou	/ɔɨ̯, ɔːɨ̯/	/ɔi̯/	boy
ow	/ɔu̯/	/ɔu̯/	goal
uw	/ɨu̯/	/ɪu̯/	Northern /ɨu̯/: not present in English. Southern /ɪu̯/: see "iw" above.
wy (Note: In some other words containing the letter combination "wy", instead of this being a diphthong, the "w" is a consonant (/w/). In these cases, the pronunciation of the "y" can then vary as shown in the previous table. For example: short final in gwyn (/ɡwɨ̞n/ (N), /ɡwɪn/ (S)), long final in gwych (/ɡwɨːχ/ (N), /ɡwiːχ/ (S)), non-final in gwynion (/ˈɡwənjɔn/).)	/ʊɨ̯, uɨ̯/	/ʊi̯/	Not present in English; closest to gooey.
yw (Note: where yw is followed by a vowel, e.g. cywir, tywod, tywydd, this does not contain the yw diphthong, but a non-final y (hence /ə/, see above) followed by a consonantal w /w/)	/ɨu̯/	/ɪu̯/	See "uw" above.

== Diacritics ==
Welsh makes use of a number of diacritics.

The circumflex (ˆ) is mostly used to mark long vowels, so â, ê, î, ô, û, ŵ, ŷ are always long. However, not all long vowels are marked with a circumflex, so the letters a, e, i, o, u, w, y with no circumflex do not necessarily represent short vowels; see § Predicting vowel length from orthography.

The grave accent (`) is sometimes used, usually in words borrowed from another language, to mark vowels that are short when a long vowel would normally be expected, e.g. pas /paːs/ (a cough), pàs /pas/ (a pass/permit or a lift in a car); mwg /muːɡ/ (smoke), mẁg /mʊɡ/ (a mug).

The acute accent (´) is sometimes used to mark a stressed final syllable in a polysyllabic word. Thus the words gwacáu (to empty) and dicléin (decline) have final stress. However, not all polysyllabic words with final stress are marked with the acute accent (Cymraeg "Welsh" and ymlaen "forward/onward", for example, are written with none). The acute may also be used to indicate that a letter w represents a vowel where a glide might otherwise be expected, e.g. gẃraidd /ˈɡʊ.raið/ (two syllables) "manly", as opposed to gwraidd /ˈɡwraið/ (one syllable) "root".

Similarly, the diaeresis (¨) is used to indicate that two adjoining vowels are to be pronounced separately (not as a diphthong). However, it is also used to show that the letter i is used to represent the sequence /ij/ which is always followed by another vowel, e.g. copïo (to copy) pronounced /kɔ.ˈpi.jɔ/, not */ˈkɔp.jɔ/.

The grave and acute accents in particular are very often omitted in casual writing, and the same is true to a lesser extent of the diaeresis. The circumflex, however, is usually included. Accented vowels are not considered distinct letters for the purpose of collation.

== Predicting vowel length from orthography ==
As mentioned above, vowels marked with the circumflex are always long, and those marked with the grave accent are always short. If a vowel is not marked with a diacritic, its length must be determined by its environment; the rules vary a bit according to dialect.

In all dialects, only stressed vowels may be long; unstressed vowels are always short.

An unmarked (stressed) vowel is long:

- in the last syllable of a word when no consonant follows: da /dɑː/ (good).
- before voiced stops b, d, g and before all fricatives (except for ll) ch, dd, f, ff, th, s: mab /mɑːb/ (son), hoff /hoːf/ (favourite), peth /peːθ/ (thing), nos /noːs/ (night).

An unmarked vowel is short:

- in an unstressed (proclitic) word: a /a/.
- before voiceless stops p, t, c iet /jɛt/ (gate), lloc /ɬɔk/ (sheepfold) and before all consonant clusters (except for those that start with s or ll) sant /sant/ (saint), perth /pɛrθ/ (hedge), Ebrill /ˈɛbrɪɬ/ (April).

When preceding the final syllable in a multisyllabic word, y is most often pronounced as /ə/: cyfan (whole) /ˈkəvan/. In monosyllabic words, or in the final syllable of a word, it follows the same rules as other vowels: dydd (day) /ˈdɨːð/ (North) ~ /ˈdiːð/ (South), ynys (island) /ˈənɨ̞s/ (North) ~ /ˈənɪs/ (South).

Before l, m, n, and r, unmarked vowels are long in some words and short in others:

vowel	long			short
i	gwin	/ɡwiːn/	(wine)	prin	/prɪn/	(scarcely)
e	hen	/heːn/	(old)	pen	/pɛn/	(head)
y	dyn	/dɨːn/ ~ /diːn/	(man)	gwyn	/ɡwɨ̞n/ ~ /ɡwɪn/	(white)
w	stwmo	/ˈstuːmo/	(bank up a fire)	amal	/ˈamal/	(often)
e	celyn	/ˈkeːlɪn/	(holly)	calon	/ˈkalɔn/	(heart)

(The last four examples are given in South Welsh pronunciation only since vowels in nonfinal syllables are always short in North Welsh.)

Before nn and rr, vowels are always short: onn /ˈɔn/ (ash trees), ennill /ˈɛnɪɬ/ (to win), carreg /ˈkarɛɡ/ (stone).

In Northern dialects, long vowels are stressed and appear in the final syllable of the word. Vowels in non-final syllables are always short. In addition to the rules above, a vowel is long in the North before a consonant cluster beginning with s: tyst /tɨːst/ (witness). Before ll, a vowel is short when no consonant follows the ll: gwell (better) /ɡwɛɬ/ It is long when another consonant does follow the ll: gwallt /ɡwɑːɬt/ (hair).

In Southern dialects, long vowels may appear in a stressed penultimate syllable as well as in a stressed word-final syllable. Before ll, a stressed vowel in the last syllable can be either long (e.g. gwell "better" /ɡweːɬ/) or short (e.g. twll "hole" /tʊɬ/). However, a stressed vowel in the penult before ll is always short: dillad /ˈdɪɬad/ (clothes). Before s, a stressed vowel in the last syllable is long, as mentioned above, but a stressed vowel in the penult is short: mesur (measure) /ˈmɛsir/. Vowels are always short before consonant clusters: sant /sant/ (saint), gwallt /ɡwaɬt/ (hair), tyst /tɪst/ (witness).

== Digraphs ==
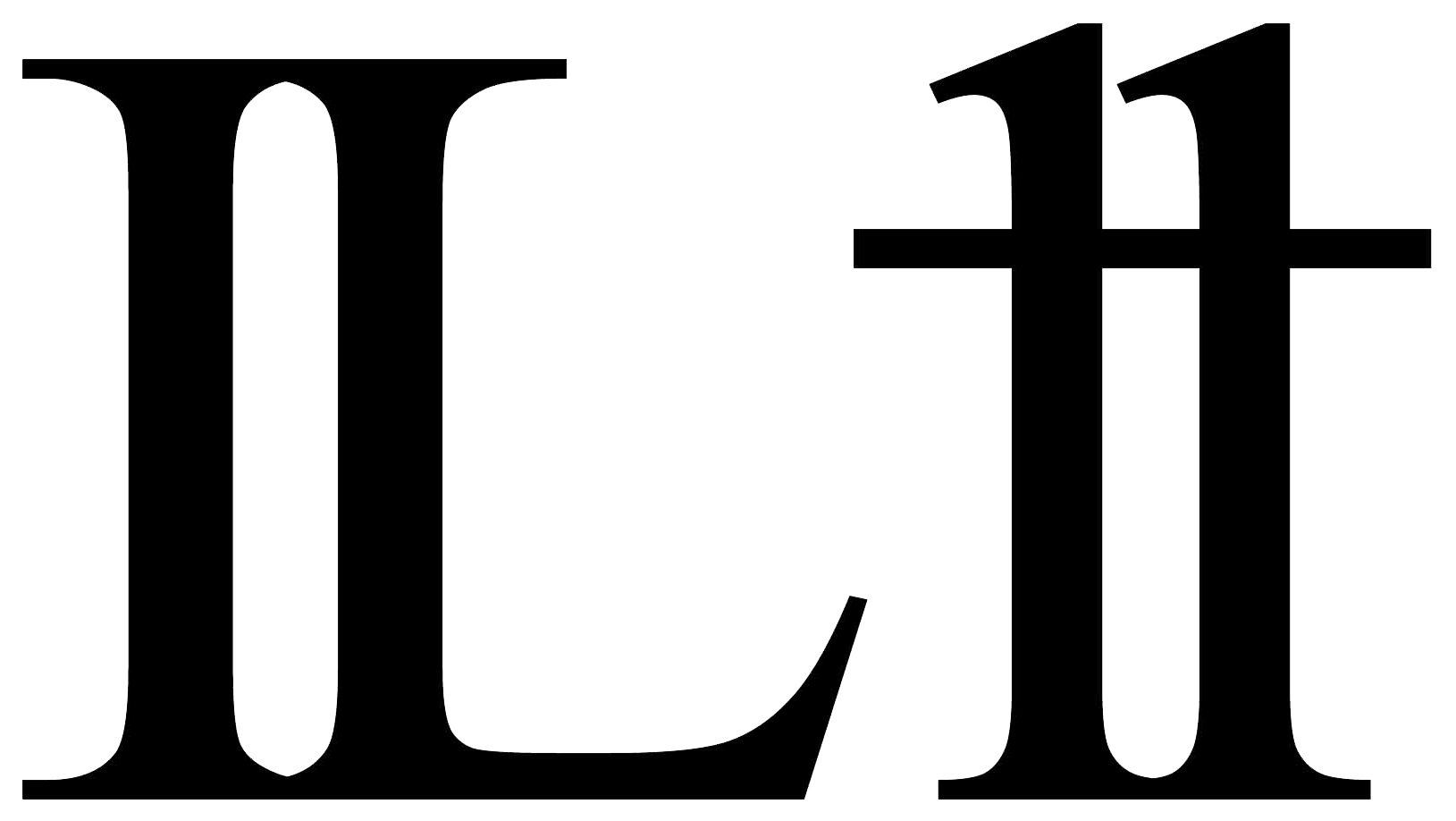
The Middle-Welsh LL ligature. Unicode: U+1EFA and U+1EFB.

While the digraphs ch, dd, ff, ng, ll, ph, rh, th are each written with two symbols, they are all considered to be single letters. This means, for example, that Llanelli (a town in South Wales) is considered to have only six letters in Welsh, compared to eight letters in English. Consequently, they each take up only a single space in Welsh crosswords. Ll itself had actually been written as the ligature Ỻ in Middle Welsh.

Sorting is done in correspondence with the alphabet. For example, la comes before ly, which comes before lla, which comes before ma. Automated sorting may occasionally be complicated by the fact that additional information may be needed to distinguish a genuine digraph from a juxtaposition of letters; for example llom comes after llong (in which the ng stands for /ŋ/) but before llongyfarch (in which n and g are pronounced separately as /ŋɡ/).

Although the digraphs above are considered to be single letters, only their first component letter is capitalised when a word in lower case requires an initial capital letter. Thus:

Llandudno, Ffestiniog, Rhuthun, etc. (place names)
Llŷr, Rhian, etc. (personal names)
Rhedeg busnes dw i. Llyfrgellydd ydy hi. (other sentences starting with a digraph)

The two letters in a digraph are only both capitalised when the whole word is in uppercase:

LLANDUDNO, LLANELLI, Y RHYL (as on a poster or sign)

The status of the digraphs as single letters is reflected in the stylised forms used in the logos of the National Library of Wales (logo) and Cardiff University (logo).

== See also ==
- Bardic Alphabet
- Welsh Braille
