= Gwyndodeg =

Dialect of Welsh spoken in north Wales

Gwyndodeg or Y Wyndodeg is one of the four traditional dialects of the Welsh language. Spoken in north-west Wales, the language takes its name from the post-roman Kingdom of Gwynedd.

Writing in 1900, John Rhŷs and David Brynmor Jones give a boundary for the dialect's southern extent as "the stream of Wyrai at Llanrhystud". Today it is most associated with Anglesey, Gwynedd and west Conwy County Borough, with the dialectal boundary (with Powyseg) in the Clwyd area. Gwyndodeg is often simply referred to as the "Northwalian dialect", and as north-west Wales contains a high concentration of Welsh speaking communities, the dialect is one of the most common forms of Welsh spoken today.

== Notable speakers ==
- Malcolm Allen (footballer), former Welsh international footballer.

== Bibliography ==
- Alan R. Thomas, The Linguistic Geography of Wales (Cardiff, 1973)
- O.H. Fynes-Clinton, The Welsh Vocabulary of the Bangor District (Oxford, 1913)

== See also ==
- Welsh language
- Cofi dialect
