= Llanrhystud =

Village in Ceredigion, Wales

Coordinates: 52°18′22″N 4°08′39″W

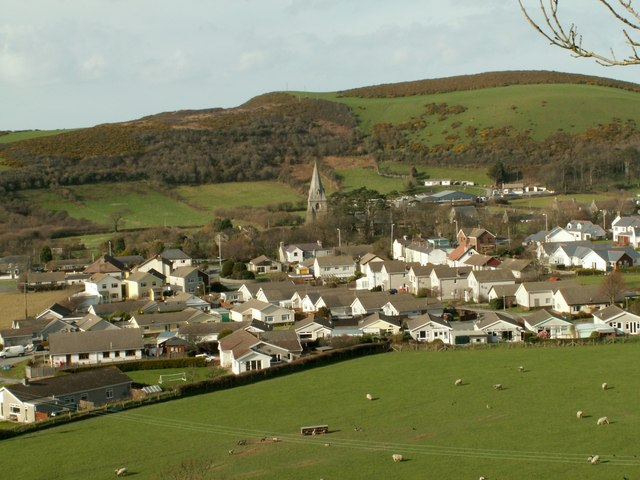
- Llanrhystud, Ceredigion Village and church from the bridleway to Castell-bach.
- Population: 966 (2011)
- OS grid reference: SN538697
- Principal area: Ceredigion
- Preserved county: Dyfed
- Shire county: Ceredigion
- Country: Wales
- Sovereign state: United Kingdom
- Post town: LLANRHYSTUD
- Postcode district: SY23
- Dialling code: 01974
- Police: Dyfed-Powys
- Fire: Mid and West Wales
- Ambulance: Welsh
- UK Parliament: Ceredigion Preseli
- Senedd Cymru – Welsh Parliament: Ceredigion Penfro
- List of places UK Wales Ceredigion Community map: Map of the community

Llanrhystud (Welsh pronunciation: [ɬanˈr̥əstɪd]) is a seaside village, community and electoral division on the A487 road in the county of Ceredigion, in Wales, 9 miles (14 km) south of Aberystwyth, and 7 miles (11 km) north of Aberaeron. It takes its name from an early Welsh saint. The community includes the village of Llanddeiniol.

The Cofiwch Dryweryn stone wall (meaning: "Remember Tryweryn") lies on the A487 a mile north of the village.

== History ==
The village is named after the early Christian Welsh Saint Rhystyd, to whom the local Church in Wales (Anglican) church is dedicated. Rhystyd was among missionaries who arrived from Armorica in the 6th century.

According to a leaflet in the Ceredigion Archives:

The present church structure dates from 1852 and took the place of an earlier church, signs of which may still be seen in the West end, under the Belfry. This old door, with the step leading down to it, was only discovered in 1958. ... The lower part of the Belfry is thought to have been laid in the 14th century if not before.

The first mention of an incumbent is of Griffith Powell, who "on July 24th 1582 was a witness before the Court Leet at Aberystwyth". The document adds that Powell had been "in 1544 appointed priest-in-charge of Llanrhystud at the yearly stipend of five pounds".

A castle once existed nearby.

== Amenities ==
The village has a primary school, Ysgol Wirfoddol Myfenydd. It also has a memorial hall, which contains a memorial table to the local fallen in the two World Wars.

The village lies on the Ceredigion Coast Path, part of the Wales Coast Path.

There is a public house, the Black Lion, which also serves meals.

The village was once served by Llanrhystyd Road railway station, on the now dismantled Carmarthen–Aberystwyth line, nearly 7 miles (11.3 km) up the A487 road at the larger village of Llanfarian.

== Population and language ==
The village had a population of 646 as of the 2011 census, and the wider community, 966. The electoral ward stretches beyond the confines of Llanrhystud to include the village of Llangwyryfon. It has a total population of 1,562.

John Rhŷs and David Brynmor Jones noted that the area marked the boundary of the Dyfedeg and Gwyndodeg dialects of the Welsh language, with Dyfedeg stretching "northwards, as far as the stream of Wyrai at Llanrhystud". 52.5% of modern residents can speak Welsh.

== Notable people ==
- David Evans (died 1910), Archdeacon of St Asaph
- David Edward Lewis (1866–1941), businessman and philanthropist in Australia

== Gallery ==
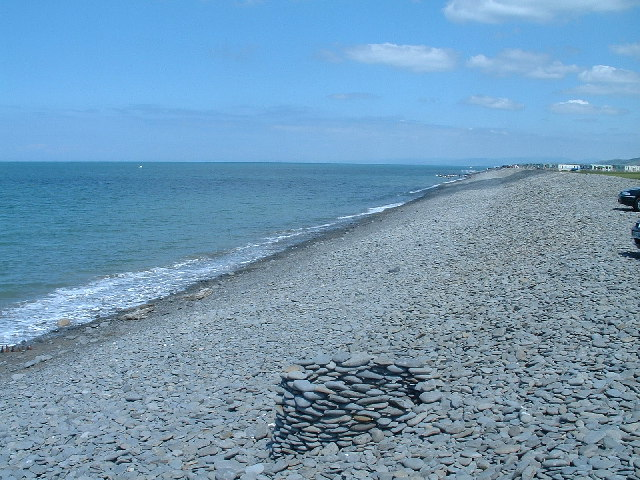
Beach near Llanrhystud

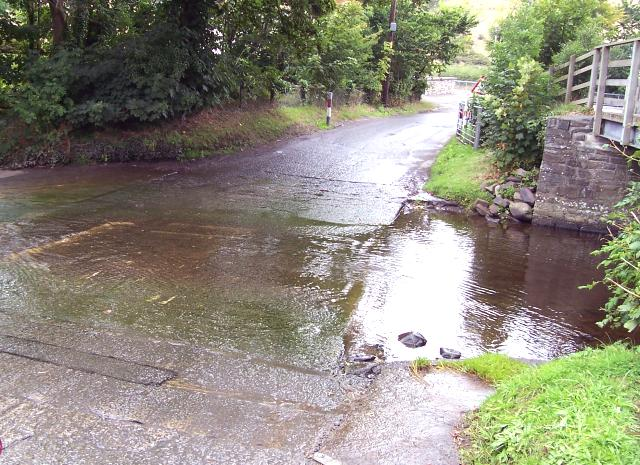
Ford over the River Wyre (now closed)

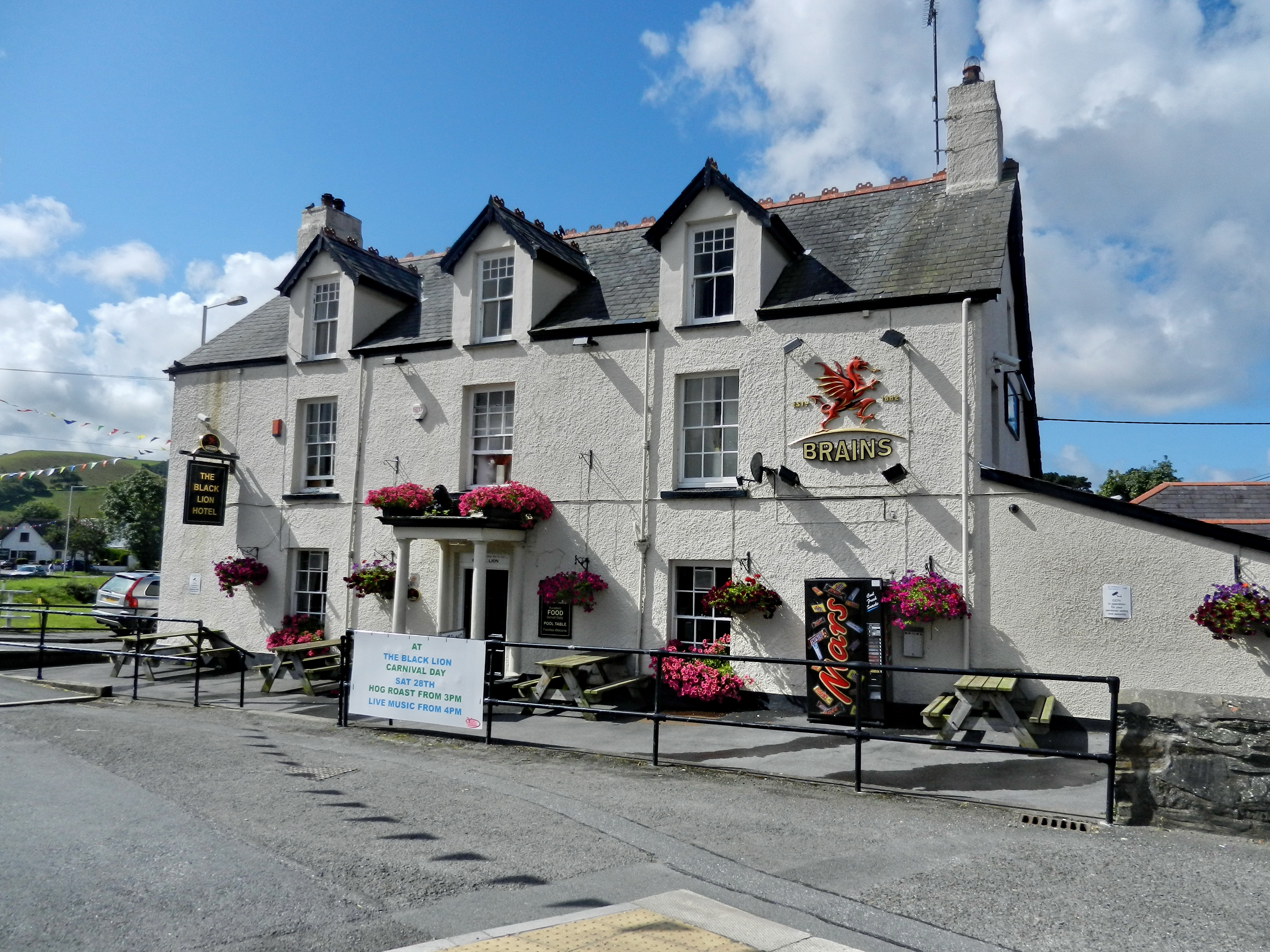
Black Lion pub

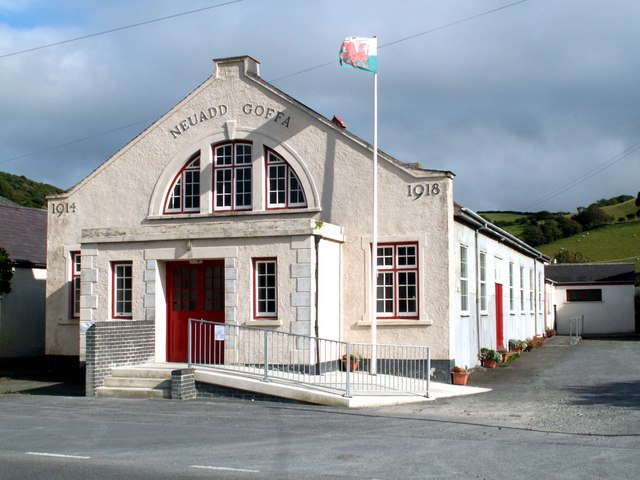
Memorial Hall

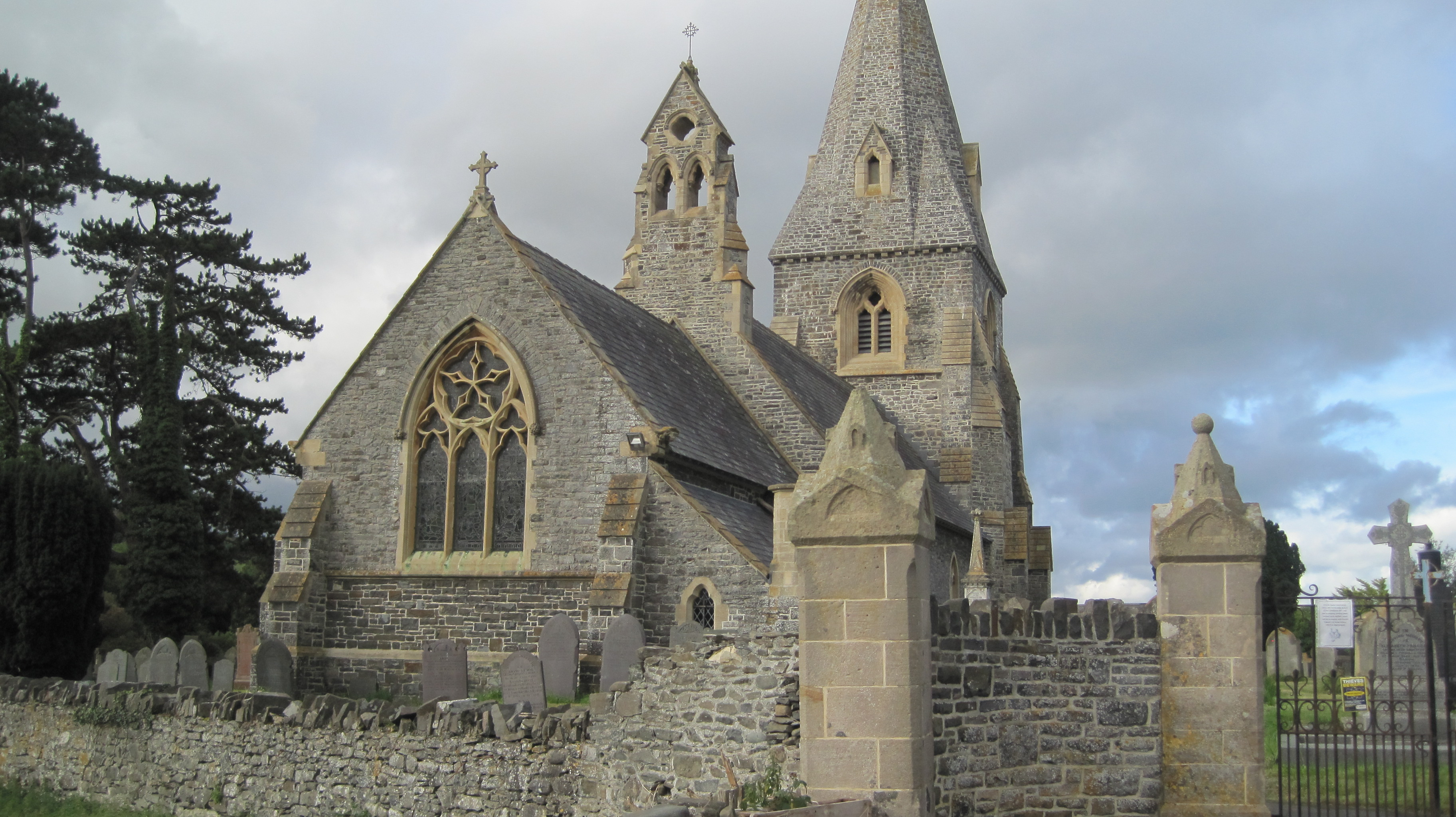
The church of St Rhystud
