= Cofi dialect =

Dialect of Welsh

- Y dafodiaith Cofi
- Native to: Wales
- Region: Caernarfon, Gwynedd
- Language family: Indo-European: Celtic; Insular Celtic; Brythonic; Welsh; Gwyndodeg; Cofi dialect

Language codes
- ISO 639-3: –
- Glottolog: None

Cofi (Welsh pronunciation: [ˈkɔvi]) is one of the regional accents and dialects of the Welsh language found in north Wales, and centred on Caernarfon, in Gwynedd, and its surrounding district. A person from Caernarfon is known colloquially as a Cofi.

Cofi has been called "one of Wales' most famous regional dialects". In 2011, the Welsh television production company Cwmni Da organised a special event at Caernarfon Town Football Club celebrating the Cofi dialect. The event was filmed as part of a television series known as Ar Lafar.

According to broadcaster Mari Gwilym, "Cofis are straight as arrows and we are extremely proud of the Cofi dialect as it is a real asset to Wales. Caernarfon has earned a reputation throughout Wales as the town of the Cofis which I think is great because it’s an extremely important part of their heritage".

The Cofi dialect has been "immortalized" in the radio monologues of Richard Hughes and in William Owen's stories Chwedlau Pen Deitsch (1961)

The actor Dewi Rhys is a Cofi. He has written a book on Cofi humour called Hiwmor y Cofi. He comments: "I don’t think we as Cofis try and be individual, but we just are. We like to think that we’re life’s losers, but we look forward to getting out there and doing different things. When you first meet a Cofi, you’re usually greeted with this deadpan sort of look, you can never tell what’s going through their minds. That’s probably down to shyness or a desire to be left alone. I think it’s fair to say that you don’t get much small talk with a Cofi."

Amgueddfa Cymru – Museum Wales has a recording of Gareth Wyn Jones speaking the Cofi dialect.

O Flaen dy Lygaid is an opera in the Cofi dialect which has been produced with the help of children from the Ysgubor Goch housing estate in Caernarfon. The idea behind the ‘Cofi Opera’ is to create, produce and perform an opera with children from the estate performing alongside professional opera singers; the opera forms part of the Cofis Bach project based in Caernarfon's Noddfa Centre. The opera has been produced with the help of Caernarfon poet Meirion MacIntyre Hughes, composer Owain Llwyd and rapper Ed Holden.
