= Welsh language =

Brittonic language

Welsh
- Cymraeg, y Gymraeg
- Pronunciation: [kəmˈraːiɡ]
- Region: United Kingdom (Wales, England), Argentina (Chubut Province)
- Ethnicity: Welsh
- Speakers: Wales: 538,300 (2021) (17.8% of the population of Wales at the 2021 census, including both L1 and L2 speakers); England: 110,000 (2007, estimated); Argentina (Chubut): 1,500–5,000; Canada: <3,885 (L1) (2011); United States: 2,003; Australia: 1,737
- Language family: Indo-European: Celtic; Insular Celtic; Brittonic; Western Brittonic; Welsh
- Early forms: Common Brittonic: Old Welsh; Middle Welsh
- Dialects: Cofi; Gwyndodeg; Powyseg; Dyfedeg; Gwenhwyseg; Patagonian Welsh; Rhos
- Writing system: Latin (Welsh alphabet); Welsh Braille

Official status
- Official language in: Wales (United Kingdom)
- Recognised minority language in: Argentina (Chubut Province)
- Regulated by: Welsh Language Commissioner (2012–present); Welsh Language Board (1993–2012)

Language codes
- ISO 639-1: cy
- ISO 639-2: wel (B) cym (T)
- ISO 639-3: cym
- Glottolog: wels1247
- ELP: Welsh
- Linguasphere: 50-ABA
- Welsh-speaking population in Wales according to the 2021 census

- Welsh is classified as Vulnerable by the UNESCO Atlas of the World's Languages in Danger (2010).

Video of a Welsh speaker

Welsh (Cymraeg [kəmˈraːiɡ] or y Gymraeg [ə ɡəmˈraːiɡ]) is a Celtic language of the Brittonic subgroup that is native to the Welsh people. Welsh is spoken natively in Wales by about 18% of the population, by some in England, and in Y Wladfa (the Welsh colony in Chubut Province, Argentina). Historically, it has also been known in English as Cambrian, Cambric and Cymric.

The Welsh Language (Wales) Measure 2011 gave the Welsh language official status in Wales. Welsh and English are de jure official languages of the Senedd (the Welsh parliament). According to the 2021 census, 538,300 usual residents in Wales aged three or over (17.8% of the population) were able to speak Welsh, while just over a quarter (25.1%) reported having some Welsh language skills.

Other surveys have produced higher figures: a survey in 2022–2023 found that 34% of people aged 16 or over could speak Welsh (of whom 18 per cent said they could speak Welsh, and 16 per cent said they had some Welsh speaking ability).

Other survey data estimated that 845,200 people aged three or over in Wales (27.4 per cent) could speak Welsh in June 2026. The survey figures indicate an overall increase since March 2010, when the estimate was 731,000 (25.2 per cent), following a gradual decline between 2001 and 2007.

Almost half of all Welsh speakers consider themselves fluent, while 20% are able to speak a fair amount. 56% of Welsh speakers speak the language daily, and 19% speak the language weekly. Since 1951, the number of Welsh speakers living in Wales has gone up, though the percentage of Welsh speakers with respect to the entire population of Wales has decreased every census year, with the exception of the 1991 and the 2001 UK Census.

The Welsh Government plans to increase the number of Welsh-language speakers to one million, and to double the daily use of the language, by 2050. Since 1980, the number of children attending Welsh-medium schools has increased, while the number going to Welsh bilingual and dual-medium schools has decreased. Welsh is considered the least endangered Celtic language by UNESCO.

== History ==
The language of the Welsh developed from the language of Britons. The emergence of Welsh was not instantaneous and clearly identifiable. Instead, the shift occurred over a long period, with some historians claiming that it had happened by as late as the 9th century, with a watershed moment being that proposed by linguist Kenneth H. Jackson, the Battle of Dyrham, a military battle between the West Saxons and the Britons in 577 AD, which split the South Western British from direct overland contact with the Welsh.

Four periods are identified in the history of Welsh, with rather indistinct boundaries: Primitive Welsh, Old Welsh, Middle Welsh, and Modern Welsh. The period immediately following the language's emergence is sometimes referred to as Primitive Welsh, followed by the Old Welsh period – which is generally considered to stretch from the beginning of the 9th century to sometime during the 12th century. The Middle Welsh period is considered to have lasted from then until the 14th century, when the Modern Welsh period began, which in turn is divided into Early and Late Modern Welsh.

Late Modern Welsh, which is still the form spoken today started with William Morgan's 1588 translation of the Bible, and is still readable to most Welsh readers today. This Bible was the first Welsh translation of the whole Bible, and due to the Protestant Reformation in Wales emphasising literacy and vernacular reading of the Bible this standardised the language across Wales.

The first Welsh dictionary was the Antiquae linguae Britannicae as a Welsh-Latin dictionary published in 1632 by John Davies, who was an assistant in translating the 1588 Bible. The first Welsh-English dictionary was published in fifteen parts between 1770 and 1794 by John Walters based on the work of William Gambold.

The word Welsh is a descendant, via Old English wealh, wielisc, of the Proto-Germanic word *Walhaz, which was derived from the name of the Celtic people known to the Romans as Volcae and which came to refer to speakers of Celtic languages, and then indiscriminately to the people of the Western Roman Empire. In Old English the term went through semantic narrowing, coming to refer to either Britons in particular or, in some contexts, slaves. The plural form Wēalas evolved into the name for their territory, Wales.

The modern names for various Romance-speaking people in Continental Europe (e.g. Walloons, Valaisans, Vlachs/Wallachians, and Włosi, the Polish name for Italians) have a similar etymology. The Welsh term for the language, Cymraeg, descends from the Brythonic word combrogi, meaning 'compatriots' or 'fellow countrymen'.

=== Origins ===
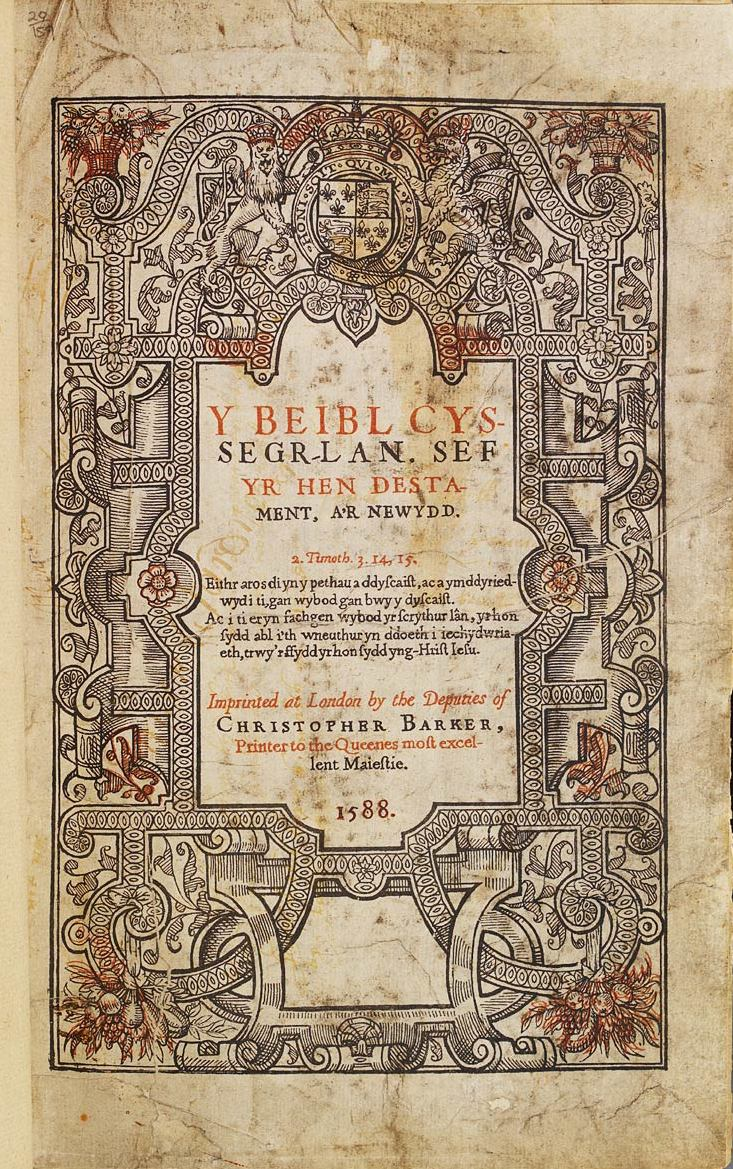
The 1588 Welsh Bible

Welsh evolved from Common Brittonic, the Celtic language spoken by the ancient Celtic Britons. Classified as Insular Celtic, the British language probably arrived in Britain during the Bronze Age or Iron Age and was probably spoken throughout the island south of the Firth of Forth. During the Early Middle Ages the British language began to fragment due to increased dialect differentiation, thus evolving into Welsh and the other Brittonic languages. It is not clear when Welsh became distinct.

Linguist Kenneth H. Jackson has suggested that the evolution in syllabic structure and sound pattern was complete by around 550 AD, and labelled the period between then and about 800 AD "Primitive Welsh". This Primitive Welsh may have been spoken in both Wales and the Hen Ogledd ('Old North') – the Brittonic-speaking areas of what are now northern England and southern Scotland – and therefore may have been the ancestor of Cumbric as well as Welsh. Jackson, however, believed that the two varieties were already distinct by that time.

The earliest Welsh poetry – that attributed to the Cynfeirdd or "Early Poets" – is generally considered to date to the Primitive Welsh period. However, much of this poetry was supposedly composed in the Hen Ogledd, raising further questions about the dating of the material and language in which it was originally composed. This discretion stems from the fact that Cumbric was widely believed to have been the language used in Hen Ogledd. An 8th-century inscription in Tywyn shows the language already dropping inflections in the declension of nouns.

Janet Davies proposed that the origins of the Welsh language were much less definite; in The Welsh Language: A History, she proposes that Welsh may have been around even earlier than 600 AD. This is evidenced by the dropping of final syllables from Brittonic: *bardos 'poet' became bardd, and *abona 'river' became afon. Though both Davies and Jackson cite minor changes in syllable structure and sounds as evidence for the creation of Old Welsh, Davies suggests it may be more appropriate to refer to this derivative language as Lingua Britannica rather than characterising it as a new language altogether.

=== Primitive Welsh ===
The argued dates for the period of "Primitive Welsh" are widely debated, with somehistorians' suggestions differing by hundreds of years.

=== Old Welsh ===
The next main period is Old Welsh (Hen Gymraeg, 9th to 11th centuries); poetry from both Wales and Scotland has been preserved in this form of the language. As Germanic and Gaelic colonisation of Britain proceeded, the Brittonic speakers in Wales were split off from those in northern England, speaking Cumbric, and those in the southwest, speaking what would become Cornish, so the languages diverged. Both the works of Aneirin (Canu Aneirin, c. 600) and the Book of Taliesin (Canu Taliesin) were written during this era.

=== Middle Welsh ===
Middle Welsh (Cymraeg Canol) is the label attached to the Welsh of the 12th to 14th centuries, of which much more remains than for any earlier period. This is the language of nearly all surviving early manuscripts of the Mabinogion, although the tales themselves are certainly much older. It is also the language of the existing Welsh law manuscripts. Middle Welsh is reasonably intelligible to a modern-day Welsh speaker.

Languages of Wales 1750–1900

1750

1800

1850

1900
Key: • Welsh • Bilingual • English

=== Modern Welsh ===
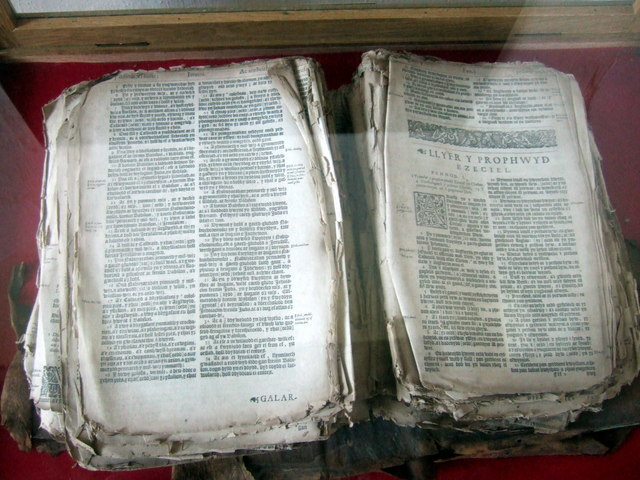
Welsh Bible of 1620, in Llanwnda church, rescued from the hands of French invaders in 1797

The Bible translations into Welsh helped maintain the use of Welsh in daily life, and standardised spelling. The New Testament was translated by William Salesbury in 1567, and the complete Bible by William Morgan in 1588. Modern Welsh is subdivided into Early Modern Welsh and Late Modern Welsh. Early Modern Welsh ran from the 15th century through to the end of the 16th century, and the Late Modern Welsh period roughly dates from the 16th century onwards. Contemporary Welsh differs greatly from the Welsh of the 16th century, but they are similar enough for a fluent Welsh speaker to have little trouble understanding it.

During the Modern Welsh period, there has been a decline in the popularity of the Welsh language: the number of Welsh speakers declined to the point at which there was concern that the language would become extinct. During industrialisation in the late 19th century, immigrants from England led to the decline in Welsh speakers particularly in the South Wales Valleys. Welsh government processes and legislation have worked to increase the proliferation of the Welsh language, for example through education.

== Geographical distribution ==
=== Wales ===
The proportion of respondents in the 2021 census who said they could speak Welsh

Welsh has been spoken continuously in Wales throughout history. By 1911, however, it had become a minority language, spoken by 43.5 per cent of the population. While this decline continued over the following decades, the language did not die out. The smallest number of speakers was recorded in 1981 with 503,000, although the lowest percentage was recorded in the most recent census in 2021 at 17.8 per cent. By the start of the 21st century, numbers began to increase once more, at least partly as a result of the increase in Welsh-medium education.

The 2004 Welsh Language Use Survey showed that 21.7 per cent of the population of Wales spoke Welsh, compared with 20.8 per cent in the 2001 census, and 18.5 per cent in the 1991 census. Since 2001, however, the number of Welsh speakers has declined in both the 2011 and 2021 censuses to about 538,300 or 17.8 per cent in 2021, lower than 1991, although it is still higher in absolute terms. The 2011 census also showed a "big drop" in the number of speakers in the Welsh-speaking heartlands, with the number dropping to under 50 per cent in Ceredigion and Carmarthenshire for the first time. However, according to the Welsh Language Use Survey in 2019–20, 22 per cent of people aged three and over were able to speak Welsh.

The Annual Population Survey (APS) by the Office for National Statistics (ONS) estimated for the year ending June 2026, approximately 845,200, or 27.4 per cent of the population of Wales aged 3 and over, were able to speak the language. Children and young people aged three to 15 years old were more likely to report that they could speak Welsh than any other age group (48.3 per cent, 234,300). Around 972,300 people, or 31.5 per cent, reported that they could understand spoken Welsh. 25.0 per cent (771,400) could read and 22.5 per cent (693,800) could write in Welsh. The APS estimates of Welsh language ability are historically higher than those produced by the census.

In terms of usage, ONS also reported that 14.5 per cent (446,800) of people aged three or older in Wales reported that they spoke Welsh daily in March 2026, with 4.9 per cent (151,900) speaking it weekly and 6.4 per cent (198,600) less often. Approximately 1.5 per cent (46,000) reported that they never spoke Welsh despite being able to speak the language, with the remaining 72.7 per cent of the population not being able to speak it.

The National Survey for Wales, carried out by the Welsh Government, has also generally reported a higher proportion of Welsh speakers than the census. In 2022–2023, the survey found that 34 per cent of people aged 16 or over could speak Welsh (of whom 18 per cent said they could speak Welsh, and a further 16 per cent reported having some Welsh-speaking ability. This was broadly unchanged from the 2021–2022 results.

Historically, large numbers of Welsh people spoke only Welsh. Over the course of the 20th century this monolingual population all but disappeared, but a small percentage remained at the time of the 1981 census. Most Welsh-speaking people in Wales also speak English. However, many Welsh-speaking people are more comfortable expressing themselves in Welsh than in English. A speaker's choice of language can vary according to the subject domain and the social context, even within a single discourse (known in linguistics as code-switching).

Welsh speakers are largely concentrated in the north and west of Wales, principally Gwynedd, Conwy County Borough, Denbighshire, Anglesey, Carmarthenshire, north Pembrokeshire, Ceredigion, parts of Glamorgan, and north-west and extreme south-west Powys. However, first-language and other fluent speakers can be found throughout Wales.

=== Outside Wales ===
==== The rest of the UK ====
Welsh-speaking communities persisted well into the modern period across the border in England. Archenfield was still Welsh enough in the time of Elizabeth I for the Bishop of Hereford to be made responsible, together with the four Welsh bishops, for the translation of the Bible and the Book of Common Prayer into Welsh. Welsh was still commonly spoken there in the first half of the 19th century, and churchwardens' notices were put up in both Welsh and English until about 1860. Alexander John Ellis in the 1880s identified a small part of Shropshire as still then speaking Welsh, with the "Celtic Border" passing from Llanymynech through Oswestry to Chirk.

The number of Welsh-speaking people in the rest of Britain has not yet been counted for statistical purposes. In 1993, the Welsh-language television channel S4C published the results of a survey into the numbers of people who spoke or understood Welsh, which estimated that there were around 133,000 Welsh-speaking people living in England, about 50,000 of them in the Greater London area. The Welsh Language Board, on the basis of an analysis of the Office for National Statistics Longitudinal Study, estimated there were 110,000 Welsh-speaking people in England, and another thousand in Scotland and Northern Ireland.

In the 2011 census, 8,248 people in England gave Welsh in answer to the question "What is your main language?". The Office for National Statistics subsequently published a census glossary of terms to support the release of results from the census, including their definition of "main language" as referring to "first or preferred language" (though that wording was not in the census questionnaire itself). The wards in England with the most people giving Welsh as their main language were the Liverpool wards of Central and Greenbank; and Oswestry South in Shropshire. The wards of Oswestry South (1.15%), Oswestry East (0.86%) and St Oswald (0.71%) had the highest percentage of residents giving Welsh as their main language.

The census also revealed that 3,528 wards in England, or 46% of the total number, contained at least one resident whose main language is Welsh. In terms of the regions of England, North West England (1,945), London (1,310) and the West Midlands (1,265) had the highest number of people noting Welsh as their main language. According to the 2021 census, 7,349 people in England recorded Welsh to be their "main language".

In the 2011 census, 1,189 people aged three and over in Scotland noted that Welsh was a language (other than English) that they used at home.

==== Argentina ====
It is believed that there are as many as 5,000 speakers of Patagonian Welsh.

==== Australia ====
In response to the question 'Does the person speak a language other than English at home?' in the 2016 Australian census, 1,688 people noted that they spoke Welsh.

==== Canada ====
In the 2011 Canadian census, 3,885 people reported Welsh as their first language. According to the 2021 Canadian census, 1,130 people noted that Welsh was their mother tongue.

==== New Zealand ====
The 2018 New Zealand census noted that 1,083 people in New Zealand spoke Welsh.

==== United States ====
The American Community Survey 2017–2021 noted that 2,003 people aged five years and over in the United States spoke Welsh at home.

== Dialects ==
There is a great deal of variation among Welsh dialects in terms of vocabulary, grammar, and pronunciation. For example: consider the question "Do you want a cuppa [a cup of tea]?" In Gwynedd, this would typically be Dach chi isio paned? while in the south of Dyfed one would be more likely to hear Ych chi'n moyn dishgled? (though, in other parts of the South, one could hear Ych chi isie paned? as well, among other possibilities). An example of a pronunciation difference is the tendency in some southern dialects to palatalise the letter "s", e.g. mis (Welsh for 'month'), usually pronounced IPA: [miːs], but as IPA: [miːʃ] in parts of the south. This normally occurs next to a high front vowel like /i/, although exceptions include the pronunciation of sut "how" as IPA: [ʃʊd] in the southern dialects (compared with northern IPA: [sɨt]).

=== The four traditional dialects ===
Although modern understanding often splits Welsh into northern (Gogledd) and southern (De) 'dialects', the traditional classification of four Welsh dialects remains the most academically useful:

- Gwyndodeg, the Gwynedd dialect
- Powyseg, the Powys dialect
- Dyfedeg, the Dyfed dialect
- Gwenhwyseg, the dialect of Gwent and Morgannwg

A fifth dialect is Patagonian Welsh, which has developed since the start of Y Wladfa (the Welsh settlement in Argentina) in 1865; it includes Spanish loanwords and terms for local features, with a survey in the 1970s showing that the language in Patagonia is consistent throughout the lower Chubut Valley and in the Andes.

Subdialects exist within the main dialects (such as the Cofi dialect). The 1989 book Cymraeg, Cymrâg, Cymrêg: Cyflwyno'r Tafodieithoedd (Welsh for 'Welsh, Welsh, Welsh: Introducing the Dialects') was accompanied by a cassette containing recordings of 14 different speakers demonstrating aspects of different regional dialects. The book also refers to the earlier Linguistic Geography of Wales (1973) as describing six different regions which could be identified as having words specific to those regions.

In the 1970s, there was an attempt to standardise the Welsh language by teaching Cymraeg Byw ('Living Welsh') – a colloquially based generic form of Welsh, but the attempt largely failed because it did not encompass the regional differences used by Welsh speakers.

== Registers ==
Modern Welsh can be considered to fall broadly into two main registers—Colloquial Welsh (Cymraeg llafar) and Literary Welsh (Cymraeg llenyddol). Colloquial Welsh is used in most speech and informal writing. Literary Welsh is closer to the form of Welsh standardised by the 1588 translation of the Bible (although the 2004 Beibl Cymraeg Newydd (Welsh for 'New Welsh Bible') is significantly less formal than the traditional 1588 Bible), and is found in official documents and other formal registers, including much literature. As a standardised form, literary Welsh shows little if any of the dialectal variation found in colloquial Welsh. Some differences include:

Literary Welsh	Colloquial Welsh
Can omit subject pronouns (pro-drop)	Subject pronouns rarely omitted
More extensive use of simple verb forms	More extensive use of periphrastic verb forms
No distinction between simple present and future (e.g. af 'I go' and 'I shall go')	Simple form most often expresses only future (e.g. af i 'I'll go')
Subjunctive verb forms	Subjunctive in fixed idioms only
3rd.pl ending and pronoun -nt hwy	3rd.pl ending and pronoun -n nhw

Amongst the characteristics of the literary, as against the spoken language are a higher dependence on inflected verb forms, different usage of some of the tenses, less frequent use of pronouns (since the information is usually conveyed in the verb/preposition inflections) and a much lesser tendency to substitute English loanwords for native Welsh words. In addition, more archaic pronouns and forms of mutation may be observed in Literary Welsh.

=== Examples of sentences in literary and colloquial Welsh ===
English	Literary Welsh	Colloquial Welsh
I get up early every day.	Codaf yn gynnar bob dydd.	Dw i'n codi'n gynnar bob dydd. (North); Rydw i'n codi'n gynnar bob dydd. (South)
I'll get up early tomorrow.	Codaf yn gynnar yfory.	Mi goda i'n gynnar fory. (North); Wna i godi'n gynnar fory. (South)
He had not stood there long.	Ni safasai yno yn hir.	Doedd o ddim wedi sefyll yno'n hir. (North); Doedd e ddim wedi sefyll yna'n hir. (South)
They'll sleep only when there's a need.	Ni chysgant ond pan fo angen.	Fyddan nhw'n cysgu ddim ond pan fydd angen.

The differences between colloquial and literary Welsh are so stark as to lack mutual intelligibility, with Welsh grammarian Gareth King asserting that they are almost two different languages in practice. A grammar of Literary Welsh can be found in A Grammar of Welsh by Stephen J. Williams. A more complete grammar can be found in Gramadeg y Gymraeg by Peter Wynn Thomas. No comprehensive grammar of formal literary Welsh exists in English. However, Dweud Eich Dweud by Ceri Jones functions as an English-language guide to colloquial Welsh forms and register and dialect differences.

== Status ==
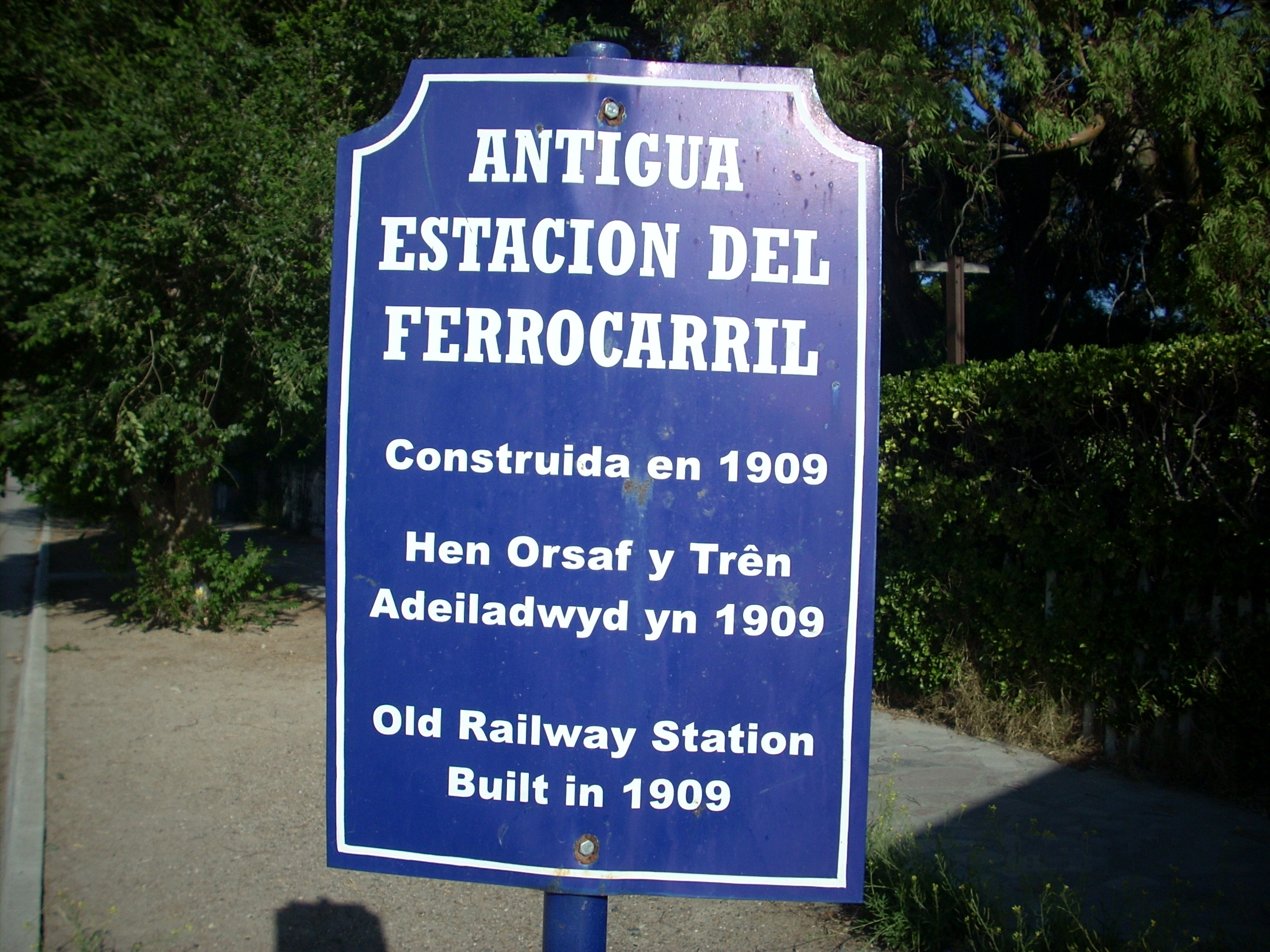
Trilingual (Spanish, Welsh and English) sign in Gaiman, Chubut Province, Argentina

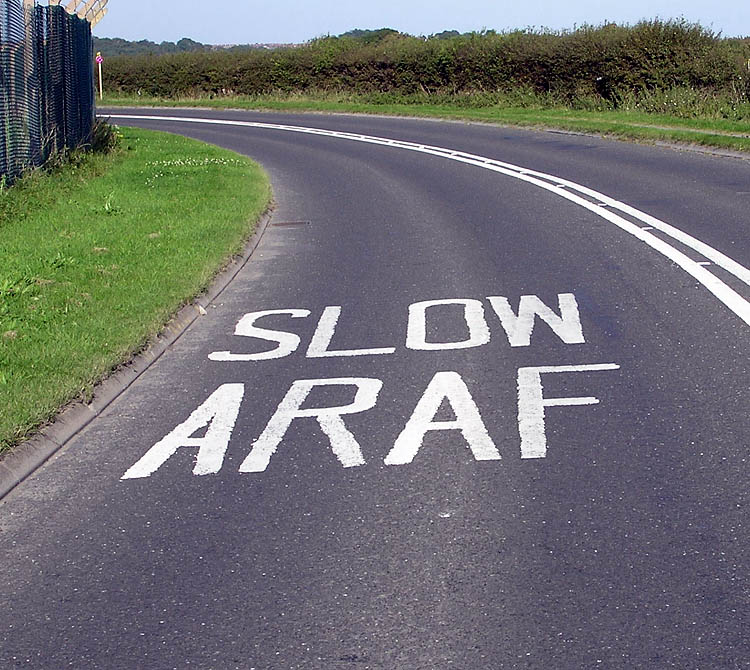
Bilingual road markings near Cardiff Airport

=== Number of speakers ===
Taken from the Census
Year	Welsh population over the age of 3	Welsh speakers	
1891	1,685,614	910,289	54.0%
1901	▲1,864,696	▲930,224	▼49.9%
1911	▲2,279,056	▲967,266	▼42.4%
1921	▲2,492,995	▼922,092	▼37.0%
1931	▼2,472,378	▼909,261	▼36.8%
1951	▲2,472,429	▼714,689	▼28.9%
1961	▲2,518,711	▼656,000	▼26.0%
1971	▲2,609,610	▼542,420	▼20.8%
1981	▲2,645,094	▼503,532	▼19.0%
1991	▲2,685,947	▲508,344	▼18.9%
2001	▲2,805,701	▲582,368	▲20.8%
2011	▲2,955,841	▼562,016	▼19.0%
2021	▲3,018,169	▼538,298	▼17.8%

=== Legal status ===
Calls for the Welsh language to be granted official status grew with the establishment of the nationalist political party Plaid Cymru in 1925, the establishment of the Welsh Language Society in 1962 and the rise of Welsh nationalism in the later 20th century. Of the six living Celtic languages (including two revived), Welsh has the highest number of native speakers who use the language on a daily basis, and it is the Celtic language which is considered the least endangered by UNESCO.

The Welsh Language Act 1993 and the Government of Wales Act 1998 provide that the Welsh and English languages be treated equally in the public sector, as far as is reasonable and practicable. Each public body is required to prepare for approval a Welsh Language Scheme, which indicates its commitment to the equality of treatment principle. This is sent out in draft form for public consultation for a three-month period, whereupon comments on it may be incorporated into a final version. It requires the final approval of the now defunct Welsh Language Board (Bwrdd yr Iaith Gymraeg). Thereafter, the public body is charged with implementing and fulfilling its obligations under the Welsh Language Scheme. The list of other public bodies which have to prepare Schemes could be added to by initially the Secretary of State for Wales, from 1993 to 1997, by way of statutory instrument. Subsequent to the forming of the National Assembly for Wales in 1997, the Government Minister responsible for the Welsh language can and has passed statutory instruments naming public bodies who have to prepare Schemes. Neither the 1993 Act nor secondary legislation made under it covers the private sector, although some organisations, notably banks and some railway companies, provide some of their information in Welsh.

On 7 December 2010, the Welsh Assembly unanimously approved a set of measures to develop the use of the Welsh language within Wales. On 9 February 2011 this measure, the Welsh Language (Wales) Measure 2011, was passed and received Royal Assent, thus making the Welsh language an officially recognised language within Wales. The measure:

- confirmed the official status of the Welsh language
- created a new system of placing duties on bodies to provide services through the medium of Welsh
- created a Welsh Language Commissioner with strong enforcement powers to protect the rights of Welsh-speaking people to access services through the medium of Welsh
- established a Welsh Language Tribunal
- gave individuals and bodies the right to appeal decisions made in relation to the provision of services through the medium of Welsh
- created a Welsh Language Partnership Council to advise Government on its strategy in relation to the Welsh language
- allowed for an official investigation by the Welsh Language Commissioner of instances where there is an attempt to interfere with the freedom of Welsh-speaking people to use the language with one another

The measure required public bodies and some private companies to provide services in Welsh. The Welsh government's Minister for Heritage at the time, Alun Ffred Jones, said, "The Welsh language is a source of great pride for the people of Wales, whether they speak it or not, and I am delighted that this measure has now become law. I am very proud to have steered legislation through the Assembly which confirms the official status of the Welsh language; which creates a strong advocate for Welsh speakers and will improve the quality and quantity of services available through the medium of Welsh. I believe that everyone who wants to access services in the Welsh language should be able to do so, and that is what this government has worked towards. This legislation is an important and historic step forward for the language, its speakers and for the nation." The measure was not welcomed warmly by all supporters: Bethan Williams, chairman of the Welsh Language Society, gave a mixed response to the move, saying,

Through this measure we have won official status for the language and that has been warmly welcomed. But there was a core principle missing in the law passed by the Assembly before Christmas. It doesn't give language rights to the people of Wales in every aspect of their lives. Despite that, an amendment to that effect was supported by 18 Assembly Members from three different parties, and that was a significant step forward.

On 5 October 2011, Meri Huws, Chair of the Welsh Language Board, was appointed the new Welsh Language Commissioner. She released a statement that she was "delighted" to have been appointed to the "hugely important role", adding, "I look forward to working with the Welsh Government and organisations in Wales in developing the new system of standards. I will look to build on the good work that has been done by the Welsh Language Board and others to strengthen the Welsh language and ensure that it continues to thrive." First Minister Carwyn Jones said that Huws would act as a champion for the Welsh language, though some had concerns over her appointment: Plaid Cymru spokeswoman Bethan Jenkins said, "I have concerns about the transition from Meri Huws's role from the Welsh Language Board to the language commissioner, and I will be asking the Welsh government how this will be successfully managed. We must be sure that there is no conflict of interest, and that the Welsh Language Commissioner can demonstrate how she will offer the required fresh approach to this new role." Huws started her role as the Welsh Language Commissioner on 1 April 2012.

Local councils and the Senedd use Welsh, issuing Welsh versions of their literature, to varying degrees.

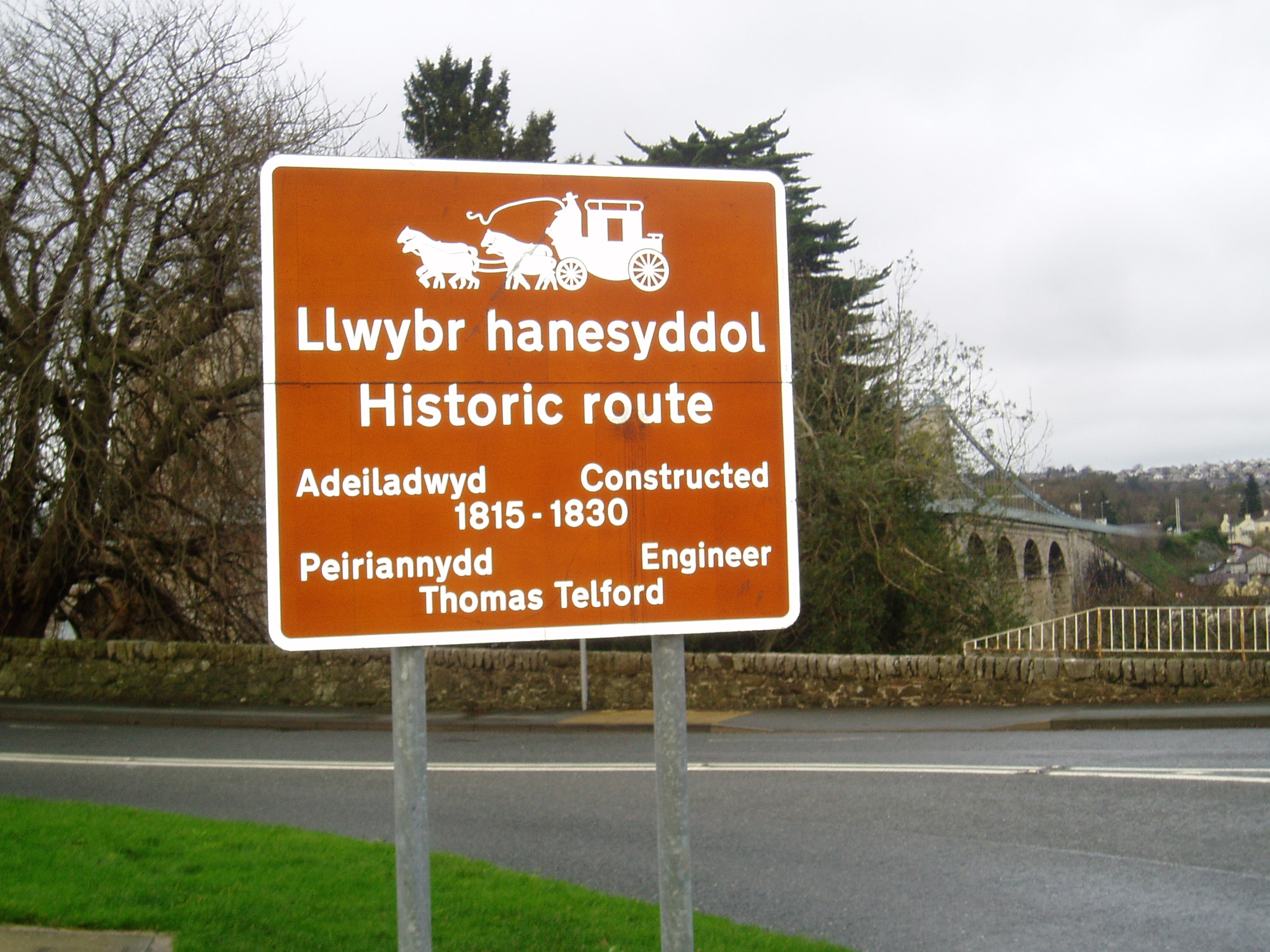
A bilingual road sign on the A5 near Menai Bridge

Road signs in Wales are in Welsh and English. Prior to 2016, the choice of which language to display first was the responsibility of the local council. Since then, as part of the Welsh Language (Wales) Measure 2011, all new signs have Welsh displayed first. There have been incidents of one of the languages being vandalised, which may be considered a hate crime.

Since 2000, the teaching of Welsh has been compulsory in all schools in Wales up to age 16; this has had an effect in stabilising and reversing the decline in the language.

Text on UK coins tends to be in English and Latin. However, a Welsh-language edge inscription was used on pound coins dated 1985, 1990 and 1995, which circulated in all parts of the UK prior to their 2017 withdrawal. The wording is Pleidiol wyf i'm gwlad (Welsh for 'True am I to my country'), and derives from the national anthem of Wales, "Hen Wlad Fy Nhadau". Banknotes used in Wales are in English only, as these are issued by the Bank of England for both England and Wales.

Some shops employ bilingual signage. Welsh sometimes appears on product packaging or instructions.

The UK government has ratified the European Charter for Regional or Minority Languages in respect of Welsh.

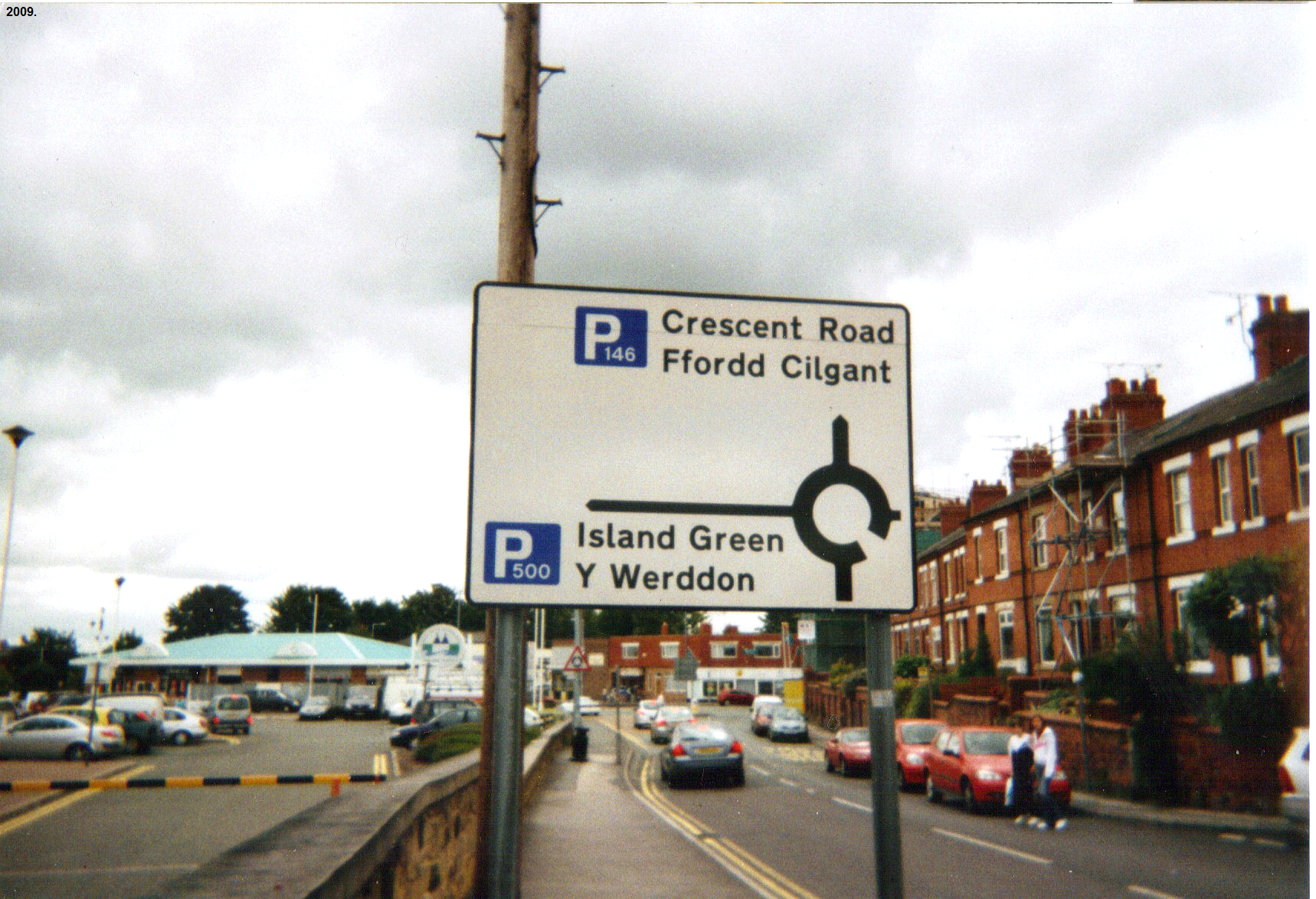
Bilingual road sign near Wrexham Central station

The language has greatly increased its prominence since the creation of the television channel S4C in November 1982, which until digital switchover in 2010 broadcast 70 per cent of Channel 4's programming along with a majority of Welsh language shows during peak viewing hours. The all-Welsh-language digital station S4C Digidol is available throughout Europe on satellite and online throughout the UK. Since the digital switchover was completed in South Wales on 31 March 2010, S4C Digidol became the main broadcasting channel and fully in Welsh. The main evening television news provided by the BBC in Welsh is available for download. There is also a Welsh-language radio station, BBC Radio Cymru, which was launched in 1977.

The only Welsh-language national newspaper Y Cymro (The Welshman) was published weekly until 2017, and monthly thereafter, following a change in ownership. There is no daily newspaper in Welsh. A daily newspaper called Y Byd (The World) was scheduled to be launched on 3 March 2008, but was scrapped, owing to insufficient sales of subscriptions and the Welsh Government offering only one third of the £600,000 public funding it needed. There is a Welsh-language online news service which publishes news stories in Welsh called Golwg360 ('360 [degree] view').

As of March 2021, there were 58 local Welsh language community newspapers, known as Papurau Bro, in circulation.

=== In education ===
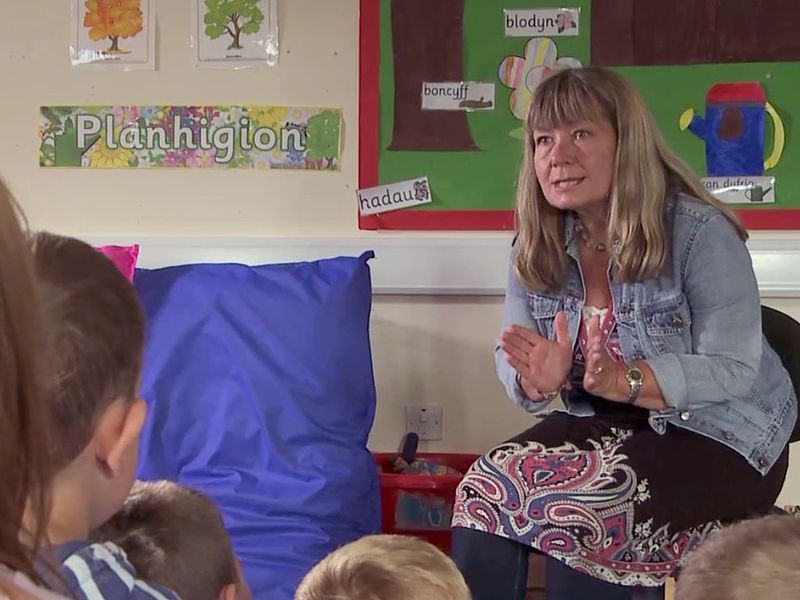
Welsh language as the medium of instruction

The decade around 1840 was a period of great social upheaval in Wales, manifested in the Chartist movement. In 1839, 20,000 people marched on Newport, resulting in a riot when 20 people were killed by soldiers defending the Westgate Hotel, and the Rebecca Riots where tollbooths on turnpikes were systematically destroyed.

This unrest brought the state of education in Wales to the attention of the British government since social reformers of the time considered education as a means of dealing with social ills. The Times newspaper was prominent among those who considered that the lack of education of the Welsh people was the root cause of most of the problems.

In July 1846, three commissioners, R.R.W. Lingen, Jellynger C. Symons and H.R. Vaughan Johnson, were appointed to inquire into the state of education in Wales; the Commissioners were all Anglicans and thus presumed unsympathetic to the nonconformist majority in Wales. The Commissioners presented their report to the Government on 1 July 1847 in three large blue-bound volumes. This report quickly became known in Wales as the Brad y Llyfrau Gleision (Treason of the Blue Books) since, apart from documenting the state of education in Wales, the Commissioners were also free with their comments disparaging the language, nonconformity, and the morals of the Welsh people in general. An immediate effect of the report was that ordinary Welsh people began to believe that the only way to get on in the world was through the medium of English, and an inferiority complex developed about the Welsh language whose effects have not yet been completely eradicated. The historian Professor Kenneth O. Morgan referred to the significance of the report and its consequences as "the Glencoe and the Amritsar of Welsh history".

In the later 19th century, the teaching of English in Welsh schools was generally supported by the Welsh public and parents who saw it as the language of economic advancement. Virtually all teaching in the schools of Wales was in English, even in areas where the pupils barely understood the language. Some schools used the Welsh Not, a piece of wood, often bearing the letters "WN", which was hung around the neck of any pupil caught speaking Welsh. The pupil could pass it on to any schoolmate heard speaking Welsh, with the pupil wearing it at the end of the day being punished. One of the most famous Welsh-born pioneers of higher education in Wales was Sir Hugh Owen. He made great progress in the cause of education, and more especially the University College of Wales at Aberystwyth, of which he was chief founder. He has been credited with the Welsh Intermediate Education Act 1889 (52 & 53 Vict c 40), following which several new Welsh schools were built. The first was completed in 1894 and named Ysgol Syr Hugh Owen.

Towards the beginning of the 20th century this policy slowly began to change, partly owing to the efforts of O.M. Edwards when he became chief inspector of schools for Wales in 1907.

A Welsh Government video of an English medium school in Wales, where introducing the Welsh language has boosted the exam results

The Ysgol Gymraeg Aberystwyth ('Aberystwyth Welsh School') was founded in 1939 by Sir Ifan ap Owen Edwards, the son of O.M. Edwards, as the first Welsh Primary School. The headteacher was Norah Isaac. Ysgol Gymraeg Aberystwyth is still a very successful school, and now there are Welsh-language primary schools all over the country. Ysgol Glan Clwyd was established in Rhyl in 1956 as the first Welsh-medium secondary school.

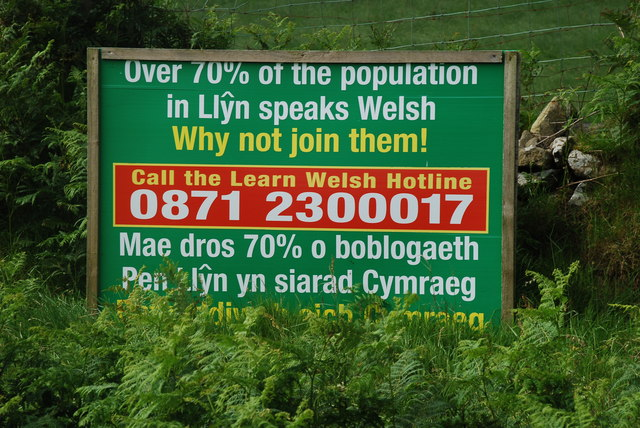
Sign promoting the learning of Welsh

Welsh is now widely used in education, with 101,345 children and young people in Wales receiving their education in Welsh medium schools in 2014/15, 65,460 in primary and 35,885 in secondary. 26 per cent of all schools in Wales are defined as Welsh medium schools, with a further 7.3 per cent offering some Welsh-medium instruction to pupils. 22 per cent of pupils are in schools in which Welsh is the primary language of instruction. Under the National Curriculum, it is compulsory that all students study Welsh up to the age of 16 as either a first or a second language. Some students choose to continue with their studies through the medium of Welsh for the completion of their A-levels as well as during their college years. All local education authorities in Wales have schools providing bilingual or Welsh-medium education. The remainder study Welsh as a second language in English-medium schools. Specialist teachers of Welsh called Athrawon Bro support the teaching of Welsh in the National Curriculum. Welsh is also taught in adult education classes. The Welsh Government has recently set up six centres of excellence in the teaching of Welsh for Adults, with centres in North Wales, Mid Wales, South West, Glamorgan, Gwent, and Cardiff.

The ability to speak Welsh or to have Welsh as a qualification is desirable for certain career choices in Wales, such as teaching or customer service. All universities in Wales teach courses in the language, with many undergraduate and post-graduate degree programmes offered in the medium of Welsh, ranging from law, modern languages, social sciences, and also other sciences such as biological sciences. Aberystwyth, Cardiff, Bangor, and Swansea have all had chairs in Welsh since their virtual establishment, and all their schools of Welsh are successful centres for the study of the Welsh language and its literature, offering a BA in Welsh as well as post-graduate courses. At all Welsh universities and the Open University, students have the right to submit assessed work and sit exams in Welsh even if the course was taught in English (usually the only exception is where the course requires demonstrating proficiency in another language). Following a commitment made in the One Wales coalition government between Labour and Plaid Cymru, the Coleg Cymraeg Cenedlaethol (Welsh Language National College) was established. The purpose of the federal structured college, spread out between all the universities of Wales, is to provide and also advance Welsh medium courses and Welsh medium scholarship and research in Welsh universities. There is also a Welsh-medium academic journal called Gwerddon ('Oasis'), which is a platform for academic research in Welsh and is published quarterly. There have been calls for more teaching of Welsh in English-medium schools.

=== Use in professional engineering ===
When conducting applicants' professional reviews for Chartered Engineer status, the Institution of Engineering and Technology accepts applications in Welsh and will conduct face-to-face interviews in Welsh if requested to do so. One of the requirements for Chartered Engineers is also to be able to communicate effectively in English.

=== In information technology ===
Like many of the world's languages, the Welsh language has seen an increased use and presence on the internet, ranging from formal lists of terminology in a variety of fields to Welsh language interfaces for Windows XP and up, Microsoft Office, LibreOffice, OpenOffice.org, Firefox and a variety of Linux distributions, and on-line services to blogs kept in Welsh. Wikipedia has had a Welsh version since July 2003 and Facebook since 2009.

=== Mobile phone technology ===
In 2006 the Welsh Language Board launched a free software pack which enabled the use of SMS predictive text in Welsh. At the National Eisteddfod of Wales 2009, a further announcement was made by the Welsh Language Board that the mobile phone company Samsung was to work with the network provider Orange to provide the first mobile phone in the Welsh language, with the interface and the T9 dictionary on the Samsung S5600 available in the Welsh language. The model, available with the Welsh language interface, has been available since 1 September 2009, with plans to introduce it on other networks.

On Android devices, both the built-in Google Keyboard and user-created keyboards can be used. iOS devices have fully supported the Welsh language since the release of iOS 8 in September 2014. Users can switch their device to Welsh to access apps that are available in Welsh. Date and time on iOS is also localised, as shown by the built-in Calendar application, as well as certain third-party apps that have been localised.

=== In warfare ===
Secure communications are often difficult to achieve in wartime. Just as Navajo code talkers were used by the United States military during World War II, the Royal Welch Fusiliers, a Welsh regiment serving in Bosnia, used Welsh for emergency communications that needed to be secure.

=== Use within the British parliament ===
In 2017, parliamentary rules were amended to allow the use of Welsh when the Welsh Grand Committee meets at Westminster. The change did not alter the rules about debates within the House of Commons, where only English can be used.

In February 2018, Welsh was first used when the Welsh Secretary, Alun Cairns, delivered his welcoming speech at a sitting of the committee. He said, "I am proud to be using the language I grew up speaking, which is not only important to me, my family and the communities Welsh MPs represent, but is also an integral part of Welsh history and culture".

=== Use at the European Union ===
In November 2008, the Welsh language was used at a meeting of the European Union's Council of Ministers for the first time. The Heritage Minister Alun Ffred Jones addressed his audience in Welsh and his words were interpreted into the EU's 23 official languages. The official use of the language followed years of campaigning. Jones said "In the UK we have one of the world's major languages, English, as the mother tongue of many. But there is a diversity of languages within our islands. I am proud to be speaking to you in one of the oldest of these, Welsh, the language of Wales." He described the breakthrough as "more than [merely] symbolic" saying "Welsh might be one of the oldest languages to be used in the UK, but it remains one of the most vibrant. Our literature, our arts, our festivals, our great tradition of song all find expression through our language. And this is a powerful demonstration of how our culture, the very essence of who we are, is expressed through language."

Jill Evans MEP used Welsh in a number of speeches in the European Parliament. In 2004, her using Welsh was the first use of the language in the European Parliament. The last time Welsh was spoken in the European Parliament was during Evans' last speech shortly before Brexit.

=== Use by the Voyager programme ===
A greeting in Welsh is one of the 55 languages included on the Voyager Golden Record chosen to be representative of Earth in NASA's Voyager programme launched in 1977. The greetings are unique to each language, with the Welsh greeting being Iechyd da i chwi yn awr ac yn oesoedd, which translates into English as "Good health to you now and forever".

== Phonology ==
The phonology of Welsh includes a number of sounds that do not occur in English and are typologically rare in European languages. The voiceless alveolar lateral fricative [ɬ], the voiceless nasals [m̥], [n̥] and [ŋ̊], and the voiceless alveolar trill [r̥] are distinctive features of the Welsh language. Stress usually falls on the penultimate syllable in polysyllabic words, and the word-final unstressed syllable receives a higher pitch than the stressed syllable.

Consonant phonemes
	Labial		Dental		Alveolar		Lateral		Post- alveolar		Palatal	Velar		Uvular	Glottal
Nasal	m̥	m			n̥	n						ŋ̊	ŋ		
Stop	p	b			t	d			(tʃ)	(dʒ)		k	ɡ		
Fricative	f	v	θ	ð	s	(z)	ɬ		ʃ					χ	h
Trill					r̥	r									
Approximant								l			j	(ʍ)	w		

Symbols in parentheses are either allophones, or found only in loanwords.

Vowel phonemes
	Front		Central		Back	
	short	long	short	long	short	long
Close	ɪ	iː	ɨ̞	ɨː	ʊ	uː
Mid	ɛ	eː	ə		ɔ	oː
Open			a	aː		

The vowels /ɨ̞/ and /ɨ/ are only found in Northern varieties of Welsh. In the South these have merged with /ɪ/ and /i/ in all cases.

== Orthography ==
Welsh is written in a Latin alphabet of 29 letters, of which eight are digraphs treated as single letters for collation, for example fy comes before ffrwyth in the dictionary:

a, b, c, ch, d, dd, e, f, ff, g, ng, h, i, j, l, ll, m, n, o, p, ph, r, rh, s, t, th, u, w, y

In contrast to English practice, ⟨w⟩ is considered a vowel letter in Welsh along with ⟨a, e, i, o, u, y⟩.

⟨j⟩ was not used traditionally but is now used in many everyday words borrowed from English such as jam ('jam'), jôc ('joke') and garej ('garage'). ⟨k, q, v, x, z⟩ are used in some technical terms such as kilogram, volt and zero but in all cases can be, and often are, replaced by Welsh letters (same pronunciation): cilogram, folt and sero. ⟨k⟩ was in common use until the 16th century but was dropped at the time of the publication of the New Testament in Welsh, as William Salesbury explained: "⟨c⟩ for ⟨k⟩, because the printers have not so many as the Welsh requireth". This change was not popular at the time.

The most common diacritic is the circumflex (called to bach in Welsh, lit. 'little roof'), which usually disambiguates long vowels, most often in the case of homographs, where the vowel is short in one word and long in the other: e.g. man ('place') v. mân ('fine, small').

== Grammar ==
Welsh is a moderately inflecting language. Verbs inflect at least for person, number and mood, while nouns inflect for number and there is a masculine-feminine distinction, of which the latter is marked via consonant mutation.

Colloquial and literary grammar show more differences than in English.

=== Morphology ===
Welsh morphology has much in common with that of the other modern Insular Celtic languages, such as the use of initial consonant mutations and of so-called "conjugated prepositions" (prepositions that fuse with the personal pronouns that are their object). Welsh nouns belong to one of two grammatical genders, masculine and feminine, but they are not inflected for case. Welsh has a variety of different endings and other methods to indicate the plural, and two endings to indicate the singular (technically the singulative) of some nouns. In spoken Welsh, verbal features are indicated primarily by the use of auxiliary verbs rather than by the inflection of the main verb. In literary Welsh, on the other hand, inflection of the main verb is usual.

=== Syntax ===
The canonical word order in Welsh is verb–subject–object (VSO).

Colloquial Welsh inclines very strongly towards the use of auxiliaries with its verbs, as in English. The present tense is constructed with bod ('to be') as an auxiliary verb, with the main verb appearing as a verbnoun (used in a way loosely equivalent to an infinitive) after the particle yn:

Mae Siân yn mynd i Llanelli.
Siân is going to Llanelli.

There, mae is a third-person singular present indicative form of bod, and mynd is the verb-noun meaning "to go". The imperfect is constructed in a similar manner, as are the periphrastic forms of the future and conditional tenses.

In the preterite, future and conditional mood tenses, there are inflected forms of all verbs, which are used in the written language. However, speech now more commonly uses the verbnoun together with an inflected form of gwneud ('do'), so "I went" can be Mi es i or Mi wnes i fynd ('I did go'). Mi is an example of a preverbal particle; such particles are common in Welsh, though less so in the spoken language.

Welsh lacks separate pronouns for constructing subordinate clauses; instead, special verb forms or relative pronouns that appear identical to some preverbal particles are used.

=== Possessives as direct objects of verbnouns ===
The Welsh for "I like Rhodri" is Dw i'n hoffi Rhodri (word for word, "am I [the] liking [of] Rhodri"), with Rhodri in a possessive relationship with hoffi. With personal pronouns, the possessive form of the personal pronoun is used, as in "I like him": [Dw i'n ei hoffi], literally, "am I his liking" – "I like you" is [Dw i'n dy hoffi] ('am I your liking'). Very informally, the pronouns are often heard in their normal subject/object form and aping English word order: Dw i'n hoffi ti ('Am I liking you').

=== Pronoun doubling ===
In colloquial Welsh, possessive pronouns, whether they are used to mean "my", "your", etc. or to indicate the direct object of a verbnoun, are commonly reinforced by the use of the corresponding personal pronoun after the noun or verbnoun: ei dŷ e "his house" (literally "his house of him"), Dw i'n dy hoffi di "I like you" ('I am [engaged in the action of] your liking of you'), etc. The "reinforcement" (or, simply, "redoubling") adds no emphasis in the colloquial register. While the possessive pronoun alone may be used, especially in more formal registers, as shown above, it is considered incorrect to use only the personal pronoun. Such usage is nevertheless sometimes heard in very colloquial speech, mainly among young speakers: Ble 'dyn ni'n mynd? Tŷ ti neu dŷ fi? ('Where are we going? Your house or my house?').

== Vocabulary ==
Welsh supplements its core Brittonic vocabulary (words such as wy "egg", carreg "stone") with hundreds of word lemmas borrowed from Latin, such as (ffenestr 'window' < Latin fenestra, gwin 'wine' < Latin vinum). It also borrows words from English, such as (silff 'shelf', giât 'gate').

=== Counting system ===
The traditional counting system used in the Welsh language is vigesimal, i.e. it is based on twenties. Welsh numbers from 11 to 14 are "x on ten" (e.g. un ar ddeg: 11), 16 to 19 are "x on fifteen" (e.g. un ar bymtheg: 16), though 18 is deunaw, "two nines"; numbers from 21 to 39 are "1–19 on twenty"(e.g. deg ar hugain: 30), 40 is deugain "two twenties", 60 is trigain "three twenties", etc. This form continues to be used, especially by older people, and it is obligatory in certain circumstances (such as telling the time, and in ordinal numbers).

There is also a decimal counting system, which has become relatively widely used, though less so in giving the time, ages, and dates (it features no ordinal numbers). This system originated in Patagonian Welsh and was subsequently introduced to Wales in the 1940s. Whereas 39 in the vigesimal system is pedwar ar bymtheg ar hugain ('four on fifteen on twenty') or even deugain namyn un ('two twenty minus one'), in the decimal system it is tri deg naw ('three tens nine').

Although there is only one word for "one" (un), it triggers the soft mutation (treiglad meddal) of feminine nouns, where possible, other than those beginning with "ll" or "rh". There are separate masculine and feminine forms of the numbers 'two' (dau and dwy), 'three' (tri and tair) and 'four' (pedwar and pedair), which must agree with the grammatical gender of the objects being counted. The objects being counted appear in the singular, not plural form.

== Sample text ==
Article 1 of the Universal Declaration of Human Rights:

Genir pawb yn rhydd ac yn gydradd â'i gilydd mewn urddas a hawliau. Fe'u cynysgaeddir â rheswm a chydwybod, a dylai pawb ymddwyn y naill at y llall mewn ysbryd cymodlon.

Translation:

All human beings are born free and equal in dignity and rights. They are endowed with reason and conscience and should act towards one another in a spirit of brotherhood.

== See also ==
- Association of Welsh Translators and Interpreters
- English and Welsh
- Honourable Society of Cymmrodorion
- Languages in the United Kingdom
- List of Welsh-language media
- List of Welsh films
- List of Welsh-language authors
- List of Welsh-language poets (6th century to c. 1600)
- List of Welsh people
- List of Welsh areas by percentage of Welsh-speakers
- Welsh literature
- Dal Ati
- St Benet's, Paul's Wharf
- Welsh Language Board
- Welsh placenames
- Welsh Tract
- Sindarin (A language invented by J. R. R. Tolkien for his legendarium – a body of literary works, mostly set in Middle-earth. The language was strongly influenced by Welsh.)
