= Gwenhwyseg =

Dialect of Welsh

Gwenhwyseg or Y Wenhwyseg is a Welsh dialect of South East Wales. The name derives from an old term for the inhabitants of the area, y Gwennwys. One of Gwenhwyseg's characteristics is the change in the long a vowel to a long e e.g. y Ted a'r Meb a'r Ysbryd Glên rather than the standard y Tad, y Mab a'r Ysbryd Glân ("the Father, the Son and the Holy Spirit"). The diphthong ae is changed in the same way:

Standard Welsh	Gwenhwyseg
Cymraeg	Cymrêg
Traed	Trêd
Cae	Cê

This is a diphthong which varies in pronunciation over the Gwenhwyseg territory and not realised with same phoneme; it is also found in words like pen, pren, pert, etc. This does not occur in monosyllabic words containing a short a like mam and naw as happens in some of the dialects of Montgomeryshire. Gwenhwyseg has influenced the English spoken in the area with English speakers using Welsh words and syntax (see Welsh English), e.g. "What is on her?" reflects Welsh Beth sy' arni hi?.

Other differences between standard Welsh and Gwenhwyseg are:

English	Standard Welsh	Gwenwhyseg
to walk	cerdded	cered
to play	chwarae	wara
canal	camlas	cnel
window	ffenest(r)	ffenast
shoes	esgidiau	sgitsha
to do	gwneud	nithir
aunt	modryb	bopa
to speak	siarad	wilia
chair	cadair	catar
