= List of United Kingdom locations: Has-Hd =

The United Kingdom

This is part of the list of United Kingdom locations: a gazetteer of place names in the United Kingdom showing each place's locality and geographical coordinates.

== Has ==
Location	Locality	Coordinates (links to map & photo sources)	OS grid reference
Hasbury	Dudley	52.44°N 02.07°W	SO9583
Hascombe	Surrey	51.14°N 00.57°W	TQ0039
Hascosay	Shetland Islands	60.61°N 00.99°W	HU552922
Haselbech	Northamptonshire	52.38°N 00.95°W	SP7177
Haselbury Plucknett	Somerset	50.88°N 02.75°W	ST4710
Haseley	Warwickshire	52.30°N 01.66°W	SP2367
Haseley Green	Warwickshire	52.31°N 01.66°W	SP2369
Haseley Knob	Warwickshire	52.33°N 01.66°W	SP2371
Haselor	Warwickshire	52.21°N 01.82°W	SP1257
Hasfield	Gloucestershire	51.94°N 02.26°W	SO8227
Hasholme	East Riding of Yorkshire	53.79°N 00.75°W	SE8232
Haskayne	Lancashire	53.56°N 02.98°W	SD3508
Haskeir Island	Western Isles	57.70°N 07.68°W	NF616820
Hasketon	Suffolk	52.10°N 01.26°E	TM2450
Hasland	Derbyshire	53.21°N 01.41°W	SK3969
Haslemere	Surrey	51.08°N 00.73°W	SU8932
Haslingbourne	West Sussex	50.97°N 00.60°W	SU9820
Haslingden	Lancashire	53.70°N 02.33°W	SD7823
Haslingfield	Cambridgeshire	52.14°N 00.04°E	TL4052
Haslington	Cheshire	53.09°N 02.40°W	SJ7355
Hasluck's Green	West Midlands	52.40°N 01.85°W	SP1078
Hassall	Cheshire	53.11°N 02.36°W	SJ7657
Hassall Green	Cheshire	53.11°N 02.33°W	SJ7858
Hassell Street	Kent	51.17°N 00.97°E	TR0846
Hassendean	Scottish Borders	55.47°N 02.72°W	NT5420
Hassiewells	Aberdeenshire	57.44°N 02.58°W	NJ6540
Hassingham	Norfolk	52.59°N 01.48°E	TG3605
Hassocks	West Sussex	50.91°N 00.15°W	TQ3015
Hassop	Derbyshire	53.24°N 01.67°W	SK2272
Hasthorpe	Lincolnshire	53.19°N 00.21°E	TF4869
Hasting Hill	Sunderland	54.88°N 01.45°W	NZ3554
Hastingleigh	Kent	51.15°N 00.98°E	TR0944
Hastings	Somerset	50.93°N 02.98°W	ST3116
Hastings	East Sussex	50.86°N 00.57°E	TQ8110
Hastingwood	Essex	51.74°N 00.14°E	TL4807
Hastoe	Hertfordshire	51.77°N 00.68°W	SP9109
Haston	Shropshire	52.77°N 02.72°W	SJ5120
Haswell	Durham	54.78°N 01.42°W	NZ3743
Haswell Moor	Durham	54.76°N 01.41°W	NZ3841
Haswell Plough	Durham	54.77°N 01.42°W	NZ3742
Haswellsykes	Scottish Borders	55.63°N 03.27°W	NT2039

== Hat ==
Location	Locality	Coordinates (links to map & photo sources)	OS grid reference
Hatch	Devon	50.29°N 03.81°W	SX7146
Hatch	Bedfordshire	52.10°N 00.32°W	TL1547
Hatch	Hampshire	51.26°N 01.04°W	SU6752
Hatcham	Lewisham	51.47°N 00.05°W	TQ3576
Hatch Beauchamp	Somerset	50.97°N 02.99°W	ST3020
Hatch Bottom	Hampshire	50.92°N 01.33°W	SU4714
Hatch End	Bedfordshire	52.23°N 00.43°W	TL0761
Hatch End	Harrow	51.60°N 00.38°W	TQ1291
Hatchet Gate	Hampshire	50.80°N 01.47°W	SU3701
Hatchet Green	Hampshire	50.97°N 01.73°W	SU1919
Hatch Farm Hill	West Sussex	51.05°N 00.71°W	SU9029
Hatch Green	Somerset	50.96°N 02.99°W	ST3019
Hatching Green	Hertfordshire	51.79°N 00.36°W	TL1312
Hatchmere	Cheshire	53.23°N 02.67°W	SJ5571
Hatch Warren	Hampshire	51.22°N 01.14°W	SU6048
Hatcliffe	North East Lincolnshire	53.48°N 00.17°W	TA2100
Hateley Heath	Sandwell	52.53°N 02.00°W	SP0093
Hatfield	Herefordshire	52.22°N 02.60°W	SO5959
Hatfield	Worcestershire	52.14°N 02.19°W	SO8750
Hatfield	Hertfordshire	51.74°N 00.23°W	TL2207
Hatfield	Doncaster	53.57°N 01.00°W	SE6609
Hatfield Broad Oak	Essex	51.82°N 00.23°E	TL5416
Hatfield Chase	Doncaster	53.58°N 00.92°W	SE7110
Hatfield Garden Village	Hertfordshire	51.76°N 00.24°W	TL2109
Hatfield Heath	Essex	51.81°N 00.20°E	TL5215
Hatfield Hyde	Hertfordshire	51.78°N 00.20°W	TL2411
Hatfield Peverel	Essex	51.76°N 00.59°E	TL7911
Hatfield Woodhouse	Doncaster	53.56°N 00.97°W	SE6808
Hatford	Oxfordshire	51.64°N 01.52°W	SU3394
Hatherden	Hampshire	51.24°N 01.51°W	SU3450
Hatherleigh	Devon	50.81°N 04.07°W	SS5404
Hatherley	Gloucestershire	51.88°N 02.11°W	SO9221
Hathern	Leicestershire	52.79°N 01.25°W	SK5022
Hatherop	Gloucestershire	51.74°N 01.78°W	SP1505
Hathersage	Derbyshire	53.33°N 01.65°W	SK229815
Hathersage Booths	Derbyshire	53.31°N 01.64°W	SK2480
Hathershaw	Oldham	53.52°N 02.12°W	SD9203
Hatherton	Cheshire	53.01°N 02.46°W	SJ6947
Hatherton	Staffordshire	52.68°N 02.07°W	SJ9510
Hatley St George	Cambridgeshire	52.14°N 00.13°W	TL2851
Hatston	Orkney Islands	58.99°N 02.99°W	HY4312
Hatt	Cornwall	50.42°N 04.26°W	SX3961
Hattersley	Tameside	53.44°N 02.03°W	SJ9894
Hatt Hill	Hampshire	51.03°N 01.55°W	SU3126
Hattingley	Hampshire	51.12°N 01.08°W	SU6437
Hatton	Warwickshire	52.30°N 01.66°W	SP2367
Hatton	Shropshire	52.50°N 02.79°W	SO4690
Hatton	Hillingdon	51.46°N 00.43°W	TQ0975
Hatton	Cheshire	53.33°N 02.61°W	SJ5982
Hatton	Lincolnshire	53.26°N 00.24°W	TF1776
Hatton	Derbyshire	52.86°N 01.68°W	SK2130
Hatton	Aberdeenshire	57.42°N 01.91°W	NK0537
Hatton Grange	Shropshire	52.63°N 02.35°W	SJ7604
Hatton Heath	Cheshire	53.14°N 02.82°W	SJ4561
Hatton Hill	Surrey	51.36°N 00.66°W	SU9364
Hattonknowe	Scottish Borders	55.70°N 03.22°W	NT2346
Hatton of Fintray	Aberdeenshire	57.23°N 02.26°W	NJ8416
Hatton of Ogilvie	Angus	56.58°N 03.01°W	NO3844
Hatton Park	Northamptonshire	52.30°N 00.71°W	SP8868

== Hau ==
Location	Locality	Coordinates (links to map & photo sources)	OS grid reference
Haugh	East Ayrshire	55.49°N 04.39°W	NS4925
Haugh	Rochdale	53.59°N 02.09°W	SD941114
Haugh	Lincolnshire	53.25°N 00.11°E	TF4175
Haugham	Lincolnshire	53.30°N 00.01°W	TF3381
Haugh Head	Northumberland	55.52°N 02.00°W	NU0026
Haugh-head	Scottish Borders	55.61°N 03.04°W	NT3436
Haughley	Suffolk	52.21°N 00.95°E	TM0262
Haughley Green	Suffolk	52.23°N 00.95°E	TM0264
Haughley New Street	Suffolk	52.21°N 00.94°E	TM0162
Haugh of Glass	Moray	57.43°N 02.96°W	NJ4239
Haugh of Urr	Dumfries and Galloway	54.97°N 03.87°W	NX8066
Haughton	Nottinghamshire	53.24°N 00.99°W	SK6772
Haughton	Powys	52.75°N 03.03°W	SJ3018
Haughton (Morville)	Shropshire	52.55°N 02.48°W	SO6795
Haughton (Upton Magna)	Shropshire	52.74°N 02.66°W	SJ5516
Haughton (Shifnal)	Shropshire	52.66°N 02.38°W	SJ7408
Haughton (West Felton)	Shropshire	52.82°N 02.93°W	SJ3726
Haughton	Staffordshire	52.77°N 02.20°W	SJ8620
Haughton Green	Tameside	53.43°N 02.10°W	SJ9393
Haughton Le Skerne	Darlington	54.53°N 01.52°W	NZ3116
Haughton Moss (or Haughton)	Cheshire	53.09°N 02.64°W	SJ5756
Haughurst Hill	Hampshire	51.35°N 01.18°W	SU5762
Haultwick	Hertfordshire	51.88°N 00.06°W	TL3323
Haun	Western Isles	57.07°N 07.30°W	NF7911
Haunton	Staffordshire	52.68°N 01.66°W	SK2310
Hauxton	Cambridgeshire	52.14°N 00.08°E	TL4352

== Hav ==
Location	Locality	Coordinates (links to map & photo sources)	OS grid reference
Havannah	Cheshire	53.17°N 02.19°W	SJ8764
Havant	Hampshire	50.84°N 00.99°W	SU7106
Haven (Dilwyn)	Herefordshire	52.18°N 02.87°W	SO4054
Haven (Ullingswick)	Herefordshire	52.13°N 02.61°W	SO5849
Haven Bank	Lincolnshire	53.05°N 00.16°W	TF2352
Havenstreet	Isle of Wight	50.70°N 01.20°W	SZ5690
Havercroft	Wakefield	53.61°N 01.41°W	SE3913
Haverfordwest (Hwlffordd)	Pembrokeshire	51.79°N 04.97°W	SM9515
Haverhill	Suffolk	52.07°N 00.42°E	TL6645
Haverigg	Cumbria	54.19°N 03.30°W	SD1578
Havering-atte-Bower	Havering	51.61°N 00.17°E	TQ5193
Haversham	Milton Keynes	52.07°N 00.80°W	SP8243
Haverthwaite	Cumbria	54.23°N 03.01°W	SD3483
Haverton Hill	Stockton-on-Tees	54.59°N 01.25°W	NZ4822
Haviker Street	Kent	51.18°N 00.46°E	TQ7246
Havyatt	Somerset	51.13°N 02.68°W	ST5237
Havyatt Green	North Somerset	51.33°N 02.76°W	ST4760

== Haw ==
Location	Locality	Coordinates (links to map & photo sources)	OS grid reference
Hawarden (Penarlag)	Flintshire	53.17°N 03.03°W	SJ3165
Hawbridge	Worcestershire	52.13°N 02.14°W	SO9049
Hawbush Green	Essex	51.85°N 00.58°E	TL7820
Hawcoat	Cumbria	54.12°N 03.22°W	SD2071
Hawcross	Gloucestershire	51.96°N 02.36°W	SO7530
Hawddamor	Gwynedd	52.75°N 03.95°W	SH6819
Hawen	Ceredigion	52.08°N 04.42°W	SN3446
Hawes	North Yorkshire	54.29°N 02.20°W	SD8789
Hawes' Green	Norfolk	52.54°N 01.28°E	TM2399
Hawes Side	Lancashire	53.79°N 03.03°W	SD3234
Hawford	Worcestershire	52.23°N 02.23°W	SO8460
Hawgreen	Shropshire	52.82°N 02.56°W	SJ6225
Hawick	Scottish Borders	55.42°N 02.79°W	NT5015
Hawkchurch	Devon	50.79°N 02.93°W	ST3400
Hawkcombe	Somerset	51.20°N 03.60°W	SS8846
Hawkedon	Suffolk	52.13°N 00.61°E	TL7952
Hawkenbury (Tunbridge Wells)	Kent	51.11°N 00.27°E	TQ5938
Hawkenbury (Staplehurst)	Kent	51.17°N 00.57°E	TQ8045
Hawkeridge	Wiltshire	51.27°N 02.20°W	ST8653
Hawkerland	Devon	50.68°N 03.34°W	SY0588
Hawkersland Cross	Herefordshire	52.11°N 02.68°W	SO5347
Hawkesbury	Warwickshire	52.46°N 01.45°W	SP3684
Hawkesbury	South Gloucestershire	51.57°N 02.34°W	ST7686
Hawkesbury Upton	South Gloucestershire	51.57°N 02.31°W	ST7886
Hawkes End	Coventry	52.43°N 01.57°W	SP2982
Hawkesley	Birmingham	52.39°N 01.94°W	SP0477
Hawk Green	Stockport	53.38°N 02.07°W	SJ9587
Hawk Hill	Cumbria	54.64°N 03.55°W	NY0029
Hawkhill	Northumberland	55.40°N 01.65°W	NU2212
Hawkhope	Northumberland	55.18°N 02.45°W	NY7188
Hawkhurst	Kent	51.04°N 00.50°E	TQ7630
Hawkhurst Common	East Sussex	50.94°N 00.16°E	TQ5218
Hawkinge	Kent	51.11°N 01.15°E	TR2140
Hawkin's Hill	Essex	51.97°N 00.41°E	TL6633
Hawkley	Hampshire	51.05°N 00.94°W	SU7429
Hawkley	Wigan	53.52°N 02.65°W	SD5703
Hawkridge	Devon	51.05°N 03.62°W	SS8630
Hawksdale	Cumbria	54.82°N 02.99°W	NY3648
Hawks Green	Staffordshire	52.68°N 02.01°W	SJ9910
Hawkshaw	Bury	53.63°N 02.37°W	SD7515
Hawkshead	Cumbria	54.37°N 03.00°W	SD3598
Hawkshead Hill	Cumbria	54.37°N 03.03°W	SD3398
Hawks Hill	Buckinghamshire	51.56°N 00.70°W	SU9086
Hawk's Hill	Surrey	51.28°N 00.35°W	TQ1555
Hawkspur Green	Essex	51.96°N 00.40°E	TL6532
Hawks Stones	Calderdale	53.73°N 02.12°W	SD9227
Hawkswick	North Yorkshire	54.12°N 02.07°W	SD9570
Hawksworth (Guiseley)	Leeds	53.87°N 01.75°W	SE1641
Hawksworth (Leeds)	Leeds	53.82°N 01.62°W	SE2537
Hawksworth	Nottinghamshire	52.97°N 00.88°W	SK7543
Hawkwell	Essex	51.58°N 00.66°E	TQ8591
Hawkwood	Bromley	51.40°N 00.07°E	TQ4469
Hawley	Kent	51.41°N 00.21°E	TQ5471
Hawley	Hampshire	51.31°N 00.78°W	SU8558
Hawley Bottom	Devon	50.79°N 03.09°W	ST2300
Hawley Lane	Hampshire	51.30°N 00.76°W	SU8657
Hawley's Cross	Bromley	51.292°N 00.057°E	TQ435568
Hawling	Gloucestershire	51.90°N 01.91°W	SP0623
Hawnby	North Yorkshire	54.29°N 01.17°W	SE5489
Hawne	Dudley	52.45°N 02.06°W	SO9684
Haworth	Bradford	53.82°N 01.95°W	SE0337
Haws Bank	Cumbria	54.35°N 03.07°W	SD3096
Hawstead	Suffolk	52.19°N 00.70°E	TL8559
Hawstead Green	Suffolk	52.18°N 00.71°E	TL8658
Hawthorn	Hampshire	51.09°N 01.04°W	SU6733
Hawthorn	Rhondda, Cynon, Taff	51.58°N 03.31°W	ST0988
Hawthorn	Durham	54.79°N 01.36°W	NZ4145
Hawthorn Corner	Kent	51.35°N 01.17°E	TR2167
Hawthorn Hill	Berkshire	51.45°N 00.74°W	SU8774
Hawthorn Hill	Lincolnshire	53.07°N 00.19°W	TF2155
Hawthorpe	Lincolnshire	52.83°N 00.45°W	TF0427
Hawton	Nottinghamshire	53.05°N 00.83°W	SK7851

== Hax ==
Location	Locality	Coordinates (links to map & photo sources)	OS grid reference
Haxby	York	54.00°N 01.08°W	SE6057
Haxey	North Lincolnshire	53.48°N 00.85°W	SK7699
Haxey Carr	North Lincolnshire	53.50°N 00.87°W	SE7501
Haxted	Surrey	51.18°N 00.03°E	TQ4245
Haxton	Wiltshire	51.24°N 01.80°W	SU1449

== Hay ==
Location	Locality	Coordinates (links to map & photo sources)	OS grid reference
Hay	Cornwall	50.49°N 04.86°W	SW9770
Haybridge	Somerset	51.21°N 02.67°W	ST5346
Haybridge (Kidderminster)	Shropshire	52.35°N 02.53°W	SO6473
Haybridge (Hadley)	Shropshire	52.69°N 02.48°W	SJ6711
Hayburn Wyke	North Yorkshire	54.36°N 0.45°W	TA0196
Hayden	Gloucestershire	51.90°N 02.14°W	SO9023
Haydock	St Helens	53.45°N 02.66°W	SJ5696
Haydon (near Taunton)	Somerset	51.00°N 03.07°W	ST2523
Haydon (near Radstock)	Somerset	51.22°N 02.60°W	ST5848
Haydon	Dorset	50.93°N 02.47°W	ST6715
Haydon	Swindon	51.59°N 01.82°W	SU1288
Haydon	Bath and North East Somerset	51.27°N 02.46°W	ST6853
Haydon Bridge	Northumberland	54.97°N 02.25°W	NY8464
Haydon Wick	Swindon	51.58°N 01.81°W	SU1387
Haye	Cornwall	50.49°N 04.34°W	SX3469
Hayes	Bromley	51.37°N 00.01°E	TQ4066
Hayes	Hillingdon	51.50°N 00.43°W	TQ0980
Hayes	Staffordshire	53.13°N 01.88°W	SK0860
Hayes End	Hillingdon	51.52°N 00.44°W	TQ0882
Hayes Knoll	Wiltshire	51.60°N 01.85°W	SU1090
Hayes Town	Hillingdon	51.50°N 00.41°W	TQ1080
Hayfield	Derbyshire	53.38°N 01.95°W	SK0387
Hay Field	Doncaster	53.48°N 01.03°W	SK6499
Hayfield	Fife	56.11°N 03.17°W	NT2792
Haygate	Shropshire	52.68°N 02.53°W	SJ6410
Haygrass	Somerset	50.98°N 03.09°W	ST2321
Hay Green	Hertfordshire	52.00°N 00.04°W	TL3436
Hay Green	Essex	51.67°N 00.31°E	TL6000
Hay Green	Norfolk	52.73°N 00.27°E	TF5418
Hayhill	East Ayrshire	55.41°N 04.43°W	NS4616
Hayhillock	Angus	56.56°N 02.78°W	NO5242
Haylands	Isle of Wight	50.71°N 01.17°W	SZ5891
Hayle	Cornwall	50.18°N 05.43°W	SW5537
Hayley Green	West Midlands	52.43°N 02.08°W	SO9482
Hayling Island	Hampshire	50.81°N 00.97°W	SU723021
Hay Mills	Birmingham	52.45°N 01.83°W	SP1184
Haymoor End	Somerset	51.02°N 02.99°W	ST3025
Haymoor Green	Cheshire	53.04°N 02.47°W	SJ6850
Hayne	Devon	50.85°N 03.59°W	SS8807
Haynes	Bedfordshire	52.06°N 00.41°W	TL0942
Haynes Church End	Bedfordshire	52.05°N 00.42°W	TL0841
Haynes West End	Bedfordshire	52.04°N 00.45°W	TL0640
Hay-on-Wye	Powys	52.07°N 03.13°W	SO2242
Hayscastle	Pembrokeshire	51.88°N 05.06°W	SM8925
Haysford	Pembrokeshire	51.84°N 05.02°W	SM9221
Hayshead	Angus	56.56°N 02.58°W	NO6442
Hayston	East Dunbartonshire	55.93°N 04.17°W	NS6473
Haystoun	Scottish Borders	55.63°N 03.19°W	NT2538
Hay Street	Hertfordshire	51.91°N 00.01°E	TL3926
Haythorne	Dorset	50.86°N 01.95°W	SU0307
Hayton (Carlisle)	Cumbria	54.90°N 02.78°W	NY5057
Hayton (Allerdale)	Cumbria	54.75°N 03.40°W	NY1041
Hayton	East Riding of Yorkshire	53.89°N 00.75°W	SE8245
Hayton	Nottinghamshire	53.34°N 00.91°W	SK7284
Hayton	City of Aberdeen	57.16°N 02.11°W	NJ9308
Hayton's Bent	Shropshire	52.41°N 02.72°W	SO5180
Haytor Vale	Devon	50.57°N 03.73°W	SX7777
Haytown	Devon	50.90°N 04.30°W	SS3814
Haywards Heath	West Sussex	51.00°N 00.10°W	TQ3324
Haywood	Doncaster	53.60°N 01.12°W	SE5812
Haywood	South Lanarkshire	55.76°N 03.64°W	NS9754
Haywood Oaks	Nottinghamshire	53.08°N 01.10°W	SK6055

== Haz ==
Location	Locality	Coordinates (links to map & photo sources)	OS grid reference
Hazard's Green	East Sussex	50.88°N 00.38°E	TQ6812
Hazelbank	South Lanarkshire	55.68°N 03.86°W	NS8345
Hazelbeach	Pembrokeshire	51.69°N 04.98°W	SM9404
Hazelbury Bryan	Dorset	50.87°N 02.37°W	ST7408
Hazeleigh	Essex	51.69°N 00.63°E	TL8203
Hazel End	Essex	51.89°N 00.16°E	TL4924
Hazeley	Hampshire	51.32°N 00.93°W	SU7459
Hazeley Bottom	Hampshire	51.30°N 00.92°W	SU7557
Hazeley Heath	Hampshire	51.31°N 00.92°W	SU7558
Hazeley Lea	Hampshire	51.32°N 00.93°W	SU7459
Hazel Grove	Stockport	53.37°N 02.12°W	SJ9286
Hazelgrove	Nottinghamshire	53.02°N 01.21°W	SK5348
Hazelhurst	Bury	53.63°N 02.33°W	SD7815
Hazelhurst	Tameside	53.49°N 02.06°W	SD9600
Hazelhurst	Salford	53.50°N 02.37°W	SD7501
Hazelslack	Cumbria	54.19°N 02.81°W	SD4778
Hazelslade	Staffordshire	52.70°N 01.97°W	SK0212
Hazel Street (Horsmonden)	Kent	51.12°N 00.41°E	TQ6939
Hazel Street (Stockbury)	Kent	51.30°N 00.65°E	TQ8559
Hazel Stub	Cambridgeshire	52.07°N 00.40°E	TL6544
Hazelton Walls	Fife	56.38°N 03.08°W	NO3322
Hazelwood	Devon	50.35°N 03.80°W	SX7252
Hazelwood	Bromley	51.33°N 00.06°E	TQ4461
Hazelwood	Derbyshire	53.01°N 01.52°W	SK3246
Hazlehead	Barnsley	53.51°N 01.71°W	SE1902
Hazlemere	Buckinghamshire	51.64°N 00.71°W	SU8995
Hazler	Shropshire	52.53°N 02.79°W	SO4693
Hazlerigg	Newcastle upon Tyne	55.03°N 01.64°W	NZ2371
Hazles	Staffordshire	53.02°N 02.00°W	SK0047
Hazlescross	Staffordshire	53.02°N 02.00°W	SK0047
Hazleton	Gloucestershire	51.86°N 01.89°W	SP0718
Hazlewood	North Yorkshire	53.97°N 01.87°W	SE0853
Hazon	Northumberland	55.33°N 01.70°W	NU1904
