= Hayton =

Hayton may refer to:

== Armenian name ==
Հեթում (also Het'um, Haithon, Hethoum, Hetum), an Armenian given name

- King Hethum I, King of Armenia (d. 1271)
- King Hethum II, King of Armenia (1266–1307)
- Hayton of Corycus (c. 1235 – c. 1310), Armenian monk and writer

== Surname ==
- Lennie Hayton (1908–1971), American composer and conductor
- Barrett Hayton (*2000), Canadian ice hockey player

== Places ==
United Kingdom

- Hayton, Hayton and Mealo, Cumbria, England
- Hayton, Carlisle, Cumbria, England
- Hayton, East Riding of Yorkshire, England
- Hayton, Nottinghamshire, England
- Hayton, Aberdeenshire, Scotland. See List of United Kingdom locations: Has-Hd

United States

- Hayton, Wisconsin
