= Hawkenbury =

Hawkenbury is the name of two villages in Kent, England:

- Hawkenbury, Maidstone, near Staplehurst
- Hawkenbury, Tunbridge Wells
