= Hawen =

Village in Ceredigion, Wales

Coordinates: 52.094952°N 4.415955°W

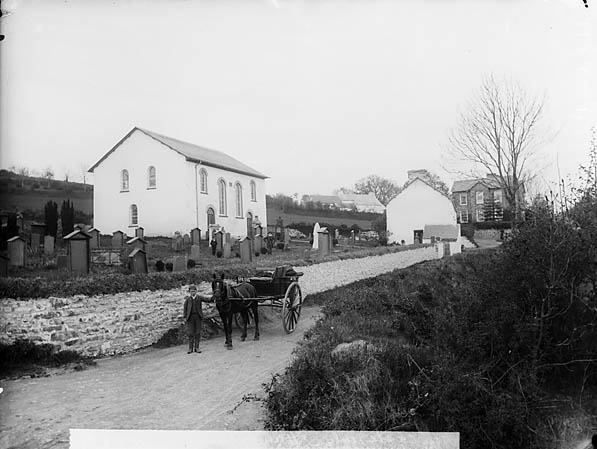
- Hawen Chapel c. 1885

- Location within Ceredigion
- OS grid reference: SN 3460 4682
  - Cardiff: 68 mi (109 km)
  - London: 187.6 mi (301.9 km)
- Community: Troedyraur
- Principal area: Ceredigion
- Country: Wales
- Sovereign state: United Kingdom
- Post town: Llandysul
- Postcode district: SA44
- Police: Dyfed-Powys
- Fire: Mid and West Wales
- Ambulance: Welsh
- UK Parliament: Ceredigion Preseli
- Senedd Cymru – Welsh Parliament: Ceredigion

Hawen is a hamlet in the community of Troedyraur, Ceredigion, Wales. There is a chapel in Hawen.

== See also ==
- River Hawen
- List of localities in Wales by population
