= Pigeonsford =

Village in Ceredigion, Wales

Coordinates: 52.159151°N 4.449160°W

Pigeonsford: Welsh: Rhydcolomennod
- Location within Ceredigion
- OS grid reference: SN 3256 5404
  - Cardiff: 71.8 mi (115.6 km)
  - London: 189.9 mi (305.6 km)
- Community: Llangrannog
- Principal area: Ceredigion
- Country: Wales
- Sovereign state: United Kingdom
- Post town: Llandysul
- Postcode district: SA44
- Police: Dyfed-Powys
- Fire: Mid and West Wales
- Ambulance: Welsh
- UK Parliament: Ceredigion Preseli
- Senedd Cymru – Welsh Parliament: Ceredigion

Pigeonsford (Welsh: Rhydcolomennod) is a hamlet in the community of Llangrannog, Ceredigion, Wales, which is 71.8 miles (115.5 km) from Cardiff and 189.9 miles (305.5 km) from London. Pigeonsford is represented in the Senedd by Elin Jones (Plaid Cymru) and is part of the Ceredigion Preseli constituency in the House of Commons.

== See also ==
- List of localities in Wales by population
