= Listed buildings in Staplehurst, Kent =

Civil Parish in Kent, England

Staplehurst is a village and civil parish in the Borough of Maidstone of Kent, England It contains one grade I, four grade II* and 106 grade II listed buildings that are recorded in the National Heritage List for England.

This list is based on the information retrieved online from Historic England.

== Key ==
Grade	Criteria
I	Buildings that are of exceptional interest
II*	Particularly important buildings of more than special interest
II	Buildings that are of special interest

== Listing ==
Name	Grade	Location	Type	Completed (Note: The date given is the date used by Historic England as significant for the initial building or that of an important part in the structure's description.)	Date designated	Grid ref. (Note: The grid reference is based on the British national grid reference system, sometimes known as OSGB36, used by the Ordnance Survey.) Geo-coordinates	Notes	Entry number (Note: The "List Entry Number" is a unique number assigned to each listed building and scheduled monument by Historic England.)	Image	Wikidata
Hill House, and Steps and Railings Attached	II	And Steps And Railings Attached, High Street			25 March 1987	TQ7859743027; 51°09′31″N 0°33′10″E		1187162	Upload Photo	Q26482384
27, Bell Lane	II	27, Bell Lane			25 March 1987	TQ7828543055; 51°09′32″N 0°32′54″E		1344369	Upload Photo	Q26628098
Bly Court Manor	II	Chapel Lane			25 July 1952	TQ7874543209; 51°09′37″N 0°33′18″E		1060739	Upload Photo	Q26313910
Chapel House and Providence Street Baptist Chapel	II	Chapel Lane			23 May 1967	TQ7871543200; 51°09′36″N 0°33′16″E		1049056	Upload Photo	Q26301112
The Shirley	II	Chart Hill Road			25 March 1987	TQ7817946556; 51°11′26″N 0°32′54″E		1344370	Upload Photo	Q26628099
Chickenden Cottage Chickenden Farmhouse	II	Chickenden Lane			25 March 1987	TQ8123743607; 51°09′47″N 0°35′26″E		1049070	Upload Photo	Q26301125
Cottons Farmhouse	II	Chickenden Lane			23 May 1967	TQ8016143877; 51°09′57″N 0°34′32″E		1060740	Upload Photo	Q26313911
Former Cartshed About 40 Metres South West of Cottons Farmhouse	II	Chickenden Lane			25 March 1987	TQ8011043869; 51°09′57″N 0°34′29″E		1051086	Upload Photo	Q26303006
Barn About 1/2 Metre North East of Clapper Farmhouse	II	Clapper Lane			25 March 1987	TQ7811845373; 51°10′47″N 0°32′49″E		1051089	Upload Photo	Q26303009
Barn About 50 Metres South East of Duckhurst Farmhouse	II	Clapper Lane			25 March 1987	TQ7763044585; 51°10′22″N 0°32′23″E		1060742	Upload Photo	Q26313913
Clapper Farmhouse	II	Clapper Lane			25 March 1987	TQ7810445361; 51°10′47″N 0°32′48″E		1344371	Upload Photo	Q26628100
Duckhurst Farmhouse	II	Clapper Lane			25 March 1987	TQ7763244623; 51°10′24″N 0°32′23″E		1060741	Upload Photo	Q26313912
Yew Tree Farmhouse	II	Clapper Lane			25 March 1987	TQ7798645108; 51°10′39″N 0°32′42″E		1051099	Upload Photo	Q26303018
Barn About 70 Metres West of Sweetlands Farmhouse	II	Couchman Green Lane			25 March 1987	TQ7849845389; 51°10′48″N 0°33′09″E		1344372	Upload Photo	Q26628101
Old Newstead	II	Couchman Green Lane			25 March 1987	TQ7928145092; 51°10′37″N 0°33′48″E		1060743	Upload Photo	Q26313914
Sweetlands Couchman Green	II	Couchman Green Lane			25 March 1987	TQ7897845354; 51°10′46″N 0°33′33″E		1039910	Upload Photo	Q26291706
Tumblers	II	Couchman Green Lane			25 March 1987	TQ7895844952; 51°10′33″N 0°33′32″E		1344373	Upload Photo	Q26628102
Turley House	II	Couchman Green Lane			25 March 1987	TQ7920944492; 51°10′18″N 0°33′44″E		1372070	Upload Photo	Q26653196
Crabtree Farmhouse	II	Craddock Lane			23 May 1967	TQ7958243813; 51°09′55″N 0°34′02″E		1039882	Upload Photo	Q26291674
Barn About 30 Metres East of Great Wadd Farmhouse	II	Cranbrook Road, Frittenden			25 March 1987	TQ7976740717; 51°08′15″N 0°34′06″E		1039891	Upload Photo	Q26291684
Fuller House Fullers	II	Cranbrook Road, The Quarter			25 July 1952	TQ7856442208; 51°09′05″N 0°33′06″E		1060745	Upload Photo	Q26313916
Great Wadd Farmhouse	II	Cranbrook Road			25 March 1987	TQ7972840723; 51°08′15″N 0°34′04″E		1060744	Upload Photo	Q26313915
Lake House	II	Cranbrook Road			25 March 1987	TQ7884442169; 51°09′03″N 0°33′21″E		1039872	Upload Photo	Q26291664
Brattle Farmhouse	II	Five Oak Lane			25 March 1987	TQ7758242344; 51°09′10″N 0°32′16″E		1060747	Upload Photo	Q26313918
Clarkes Farmhouse	II	Five Oak Lane			25 March 1987	TQ7687242432; 51°09′14″N 0°31′40″E		1060746	Upload Photo	Q26313917
Saynden Farmhouse	II	Five Oak Lane			25 March 1987	TQ7703242298; 51°09′09″N 0°31′48″E		1054687	Upload Photo	Q26306347
Exhurst	II*	Frittenden Road			25 March 1987	TQ7984642963; 51°09′28″N 0°34′14″E		1060748	Upload Photo	Q17544982
Maplehurst	II	Frittenden Road			25 July 1952	TQ7984141948; 51°08′55″N 0°34′12″E		1367113	Upload Photo	Q26648641
Spilshill Court	II	Frittenden Road			25 July 1952	TQ7922843153; 51°09′34″N 0°33′42″E		1054714	Upload Photo	Q26306372
Barn About 5 Metres North of Mathurst Farmhouse	II	Goudhurst Road			25 March 1987	TQ7726240819; 51°08′21″N 0°31′57″E		1060751	Upload Photo	Q26313921
Barn About 5 Metres West of Rabbit Farmhouse	II	Goudhurst Road, TN12 0HQ			25 March 1987	TQ7716241113; 51°08′31″N 0°31′52″E		1060750	Upload Photo	Q26313920
Ely Court	II	Goudhurst Road			23 May 1967	TQ7778142048; 51°09′00″N 0°32′26″E		1060749	Upload Photo	Q26313919
Mathurst Farm Cottages	II	Goudhurst Road			25 March 1987	TQ7731241025; 51°08′28″N 0°32′00″E		1344374	Upload Photo	Q26628103
Mathurst Farmhouse	II	Goudhurst Road			25 March 1987	TQ7725640801; 51°08′21″N 0°31′57″E		1054006	Upload Photo	Q26305692
Rabbit Farmhouse	II	Goudhurst Road, TN12 0HQ			25 March 1987	TQ7717541112; 51°08′31″N 0°31′53″E		1367118	Upload Photo	Q26648645
Barn About 15 Metres West South West of Slaney Place	II	Headcorn Road			25 March 1987	TQ7968144130; 51°10′05″N 0°34′07″E		1054039	Upload Photo	Q26305724
Barn About 40 Metres West of Slaney Place	II	Headcorn Road			25 March 1987	TQ7966044139; 51°10′06″N 0°34′06″E		1344394	Upload Photo	Q26628122
Hawkenbury Bridge	II	Headcorn Road, Hawkenbury			25 March 1987	TQ7989444509; 51°10′17″N 0°34′19″E		1367467	Upload Photo	Q26648967
Slaney Place	II	Headcorn Road			25 March 1987	TQ7971344134; 51°10′06″N 0°34′09″E		1344375	Upload Photo	Q26628104
1, 2 and 3, High Street	II	1, 2 and 3, High Street			23 May 1967	TQ7859342990; 51°09′30″N 0°33′09″E		1060719	Upload Photo	Q26313891
Aysgarth Dixon's Stores	II	High Street			25 March 1987	TQ7859643016; 51°09′31″N 0°33′10″E		1344399	Upload Photo	Q26628127
Big Bens Antiques	II	High Street, TN12 0AR			10 June 1971	TQ7857743046; 51°09′32″N 0°33′09″E		1060726	Upload Photo	Q26313898
Chestnut Cottage Kingswood Chemists	II	High Street			25 March 1987	TQ7856343200; 51°09′37″N 0°33′08″E		1045826	Upload Photo	Q26297930
Church of All Saints	I	High Street			23 May 1967	TQ7863342981; 51°09′29″N 0°33′11″E		1060713	Church of All Saints More images	Q4729527
Crampton	II	High Street			22 April 1994	TQ7860143091; 51°09′33″N 0°33′10″E		1240415	Upload Photo	Q26533340
Drey Cottages	II	High Street			25 March 1987	TQ7856243174; 51°09′36″N 0°33′08″E		1045819	Upload Photo	Q26297922
East View Redbar Electrical Limited South View	II	High Street			23 May 1967	TQ7857342949; 51°09′29″N 0°33′08″E		1060723	Upload Photo	Q26313895
Green Court Green Court Cottage	II	High Street			23 May 1967	TQ7856443146; 51°09′35″N 0°33′08″E		1060728	Upload Photo	Q26313900
Group of 2 Monuments About 19 Metres South of South Aisle of Church of All Saints	II	High Street			25 March 1987	TQ7861642950; 51°09′29″N 0°33′10″E		1344397	Upload Photo	Q26628125
Group of 4 Monuments About 7 1/2 Metres South of South Aisle of Church of All Saints	II	High Street			25 March 1987	TQ7862842958; 51°09′29″N 0°33′11″E		1060717	Upload Photo	Q26313889
Little Loddenden	II	1 and 2, High Street			23 May 1967	TQ7859343261; 51°09′39″N 0°33′10″E		1040049	Upload Photo	Q26291853
Little London Cottage Saddlery Stores	II	High Street			25 March 1987	TQ7856143189; 51°09′36″N 0°33′08″E		1060729	Upload Photo	Q26313901
Loddenden Manor	II*	High Street			25 July 1952	TQ7867643368; 51°09′42″N 0°33′14″E		1040054	Upload Photo	Q17544945
Minton House	II	High Street			25 March 1987	TQ7859843139; 51°09′35″N 0°33′10″E		1060721	Upload Photo	Q26313893
Monument About 10 Metres North of Nave of Church of All Saints	II	High Street			25 March 1987	TQ7864143004; 51°09′30″N 0°33′12″E		1298855	Upload Photo	Q26586298
Monument About 20 Metres South of South Aisle of Church of All Saints	II	High Street			25 March 1987	TQ7863742949; 51°09′28″N 0°33′11″E		1060718	Upload Photo	Q26313890
Monument About 25 Metres South East of South Chancel Chapel of Church of All Saints	II	High Street			25 March 1987	TQ7866042951; 51°09′29″N 0°33′13″E		1298852	Upload Photo	Q26586295
Monument About 30 Metres South East of South Chancel Chapel of Church Oa All Saints	II	High Street			25 March 1987	TQ7866242945; 51°09′28″N 0°33′13″E		1344398	Upload Photo	Q26628126
Monument About 6 1/2 Metres South West of Church of All Saints	II	High Street			25 March 1987	TQ7860142970; 51°09′29″N 0°33′10″E		1060716	Upload Photo	Q26313888
Monument to Anna Spong About 26 Metres South East of South Chancel Chapel of Church of All Saints	II	High Street			25 March 1987	TQ7866642950; 51°09′28″N 0°33′13″E		1344395	Upload Photo	Q26628123
Monument to Anne Viney About 6 1/2 Metres East of South Chancel Chapel of Church of All Saints	II	High Street			25 March 1987	TQ7866142975; 51°09′29″N 0°33′13″E		1344396	Upload Photo	Q26628124
Monument to Edward Usborne Adjacent to South Aisle of Church of All Saints	II	High Street			25 March 1987	TQ7863142972; 51°09′29″N 0°33′11″E		1060714	Upload Photo	Q26313886
Monument to Mrs Elizabeth Usborne Adjacent to South East End of South Aisle of Church of All Saints	II	High Street			25 March 1987	TQ7864042970; 51°09′29″N 0°33′12″E		1060715	Upload Photo	Q26313887
No 7 and Former Shop and House Adjoining to South	II	High Street			10 June 1961	TQ7857643037; 51°09′31″N 0°33′09″E		1369992	Upload Photo	Q26651258
North Cottage South Cottage	II	High Street			23 May 1967	TQ7858443312; 51°09′40″N 0°33′09″E		1060722	Upload Photo	Q26313894
Nos 1, 2 and 3 the Crown and Carriage Entrance to South	II	2 and 3 The Crown And Carriage Entrance To South, 1, 2 and 3, High Street			23 May 1967	TQ7860043072; 51°09′32″N 0°33′10″E		1372026	Upload Photo	Q26653150
Oaks Farmhouse	II	High Street			25 March 1987	TQ7861543399; 51°09′43″N 0°33′11″E		1372044	Upload Photo	Q26653169
Railings About 3 Metres East of Vine House	II	High Street			25 March 1987	TQ7857943073; 51°09′33″N 0°33′09″E		1060727	Upload Photo	Q26313899
Railings and Entrance Gates About 90 Metres West of Loddenden Manor	II	High Street			25 March 1987	TQ7858243347; 51°09′41″N 0°33′09″E		1344401	Upload Photo	Q26628129
Rosemary Cottage, Hillcrest Cottage and Kent Cottage	II	High Street, TN12 0AX			25 March 1987	TQ7857542968; 51°09′29″N 0°33′08″E		1372033	Upload Photo	Q26653158
Surrenden	II	High Street			25 June 1974	TQ7853543504; 51°09′47″N 0°33′07″E		1344402	Upload Photo	Q26628130
Tanyard House and the Butchers Shop	II	High Street, TN12 0AU			25 March 1987	TQ7859943048; 51°09′32″N 0°33′10″E		1344400	Upload Photo	Q26628128
The King's Head Hotel	II	High Street			10 June 1971	TQ7857343023; 51°09′31″N 0°33′08″E		1060725	Upload Photo	Q26313897
Vine House	II	High Street			23 May 1967	TQ7857243072; 51°09′33″N 0°33′08″E		1045895	Upload Photo	Q26298005
Wimborne Cottage	II	High Street			25 March 1987	TQ7859743039; 51°09′31″N 0°33′10″E		1060720	Upload Photo	Q26313892
Barn About 20 Metres East of Little Harts Heath and No 2 Little Harts Heath	II	Husheath Hill			25 March 1987	TQ7553441198; 51°08′35″N 0°30′29″E		1344364	Upload Photo	Q26628093
Barn About 8 Metres South-east of Hush Heath Manor	II	Husheath Hill			26 August 1987	TQ7576440757; 51°08′21″N 0°30′40″E		1240378	Upload Photo	Q26533307
Hush Heath Manor	II*	Husheath Hill			25 July 1952	TQ7573040835; 51°08′23″N 0°30′38″E		1045800	Hush Heath Manor More images	Q17544950
Little Harts Heath	II*	2, Husheath Hill			23 May 1967	TQ7550041190; 51°08′35″N 0°30′27″E		1060730	Little Harts Heath More images	Q17544977
1-4, Lime Terrace	II	1-4, Lime Terrace, High Street, TN12 0AP			25 March 1987	TQ7856743112; 51°09′34″N 0°33′08″E		1045873	Upload Photo	Q26297982
Lovehurst Manor	II	Lovehurst Lane			23 May 1967	TQ7783641359; 51°08′38″N 0°32′27″E		1045808	Upload Photo	Q26297912
Barn About 10 Metres East of Whites	II	Maidstone Road			25 March 1987	TQ7805946404; 51°11′21″N 0°32′48″E		1060732	Upload Photo	Q26313903
Brigadoon	II	Maidstone Road			23 May 1967	TQ7850345282; 51°10′44″N 0°33′09″E		1060731	Upload Photo	Q26313902
Whites	II	Maidstone Road			25 March 1987	TQ7804046417; 51°11′21″N 0°32′47″E		1054932	Upload Photo	Q26306577
Barn About 10 Metres North of Overbridge Farmhouse	II	Marden Road			25 March 1987	TQ7679244689; 51°10′27″N 0°31′40″E		1060694	Upload Photo	Q26313868
Coppwilliam	II	Marden Road			25 March 1987	TQ7781043829; 51°09′58″N 0°32′31″E		1060693	Upload Photo	Q26313867
Hen and Duckhurst	II	Marden Road			25 March 1987	TQ7805743822; 51°09′57″N 0°32′43″E		1054907	Upload Photo	Q26306554
Martyrs' Memorial	II	Marden Road			25 March 1987	TQ7855843736; 51°09′54″N 0°33′09″E		1344387	Upload Photo	Q26628115
Oak Lodge	II	Marden Road			25 March 1987	TQ7823743755; 51°09′55″N 0°32′52″E		1344384	Upload Photo	Q26628112
Overbridge Farmhouse	II	Marden Road			25 March 1987	TQ7678044675; 51°10′26″N 0°31′39″E		1054913	Upload Photo	Q26306559
Pilgrim Cottage Rowland House	II	Marden Road			23 May 1967	TQ7853843753; 51°09′55″N 0°33′08″E		1054830	Upload Photo	Q26306483
Maplehurst Mill	II	Mill Lane, Frittenden, Tunbridge Wells			25 March 1987	TQ8030041718; 51°08′47″N 0°34′35″E		1367061	Upload Photo	Q26368866
No 4, Peter Jones Opticians, and Premises to Rear	II	4, High Street			25 March 1987	TQ7859443000; 51°09′30″N 0°33′09″E		1187139	Upload Photo	Q26482363
Barn About 40 Metres North East of Henhurst Farmhouse	II	Pinnock Lane			25 March 1987	TQ7810942414; 51°09′12″N 0°32′43″E		1344385	Upload Photo	Q26628113
Cartshed About 35 Metres North North East of Henhurst Farmhouse	II	Pinnock Lane			25 March 1987	TQ7808642405; 51°09′11″N 0°32′42″E		1367052	Upload Photo	Q26648586
Oasthouse About 10 Metres West of Henhurst Farmhouse	II	Pinnock Lane			25 March 1987	TQ7806742360; 51°09′10″N 0°32′41″E		1060695	Upload Photo	Q26313869
Barn About 15 Metres South West of Nos 1, 2 and 3 Plain Cottages	II	2 and 3 Plain Cottages, Pristling Lane			25 March 1987	TQ7587041886; 51°08′57″N 0°30′47″E		1060696	Upload Photo	Q26313870
Bletchingly Farmhouse	II	Pristling Lane			25 March 1987	TQ7708541622; 51°08′47″N 0°31′49″E		1060697	Upload Photo	Q26313871
Chapmans Farmhouse	II	Pristling Lane			25 March 1987	TQ7703841699; 51°08′50″N 0°31′47″E		1344386	Upload Photo	Q26628114
Hop Pickers' Kitchen at Tq 768 415	II	Pristling Lane			25 March 1987	TQ7686541494; 51°08′43″N 0°31′38″E		1367085	Upload Photo	Q26648617
Plain Cottages	II	1, 2 and 3, Pristling Lane			25 March 1987	TQ7589141896; 51°08′57″N 0°30′48″E		1054837	Upload Photo	Q26306490
Cromwell Farmhouse	II	Station Road, TN12 0QH			25 March 1987	TQ7857144252; 51°10′11″N 0°33′10″E		1367072	Upload Photo	Q26648604
Railings About 30 Metres East of Sorrento	II	Station Road			25 March 1987	TQ7855244060; 51°10′04″N 0°33′09″E		1367104	Upload Photo	Q26648633
Sorrento	II	Station Road			9 August 1974	TQ7851744064; 51°10′05″N 0°33′07″E		1060698	Upload Photo	Q26313872
Bell Cottage, Steps and Handrail	II	Steps And Handrail, High Street			23 May 1967	TQ7857342981; 51°09′30″N 0°33′08″E		1060724	Upload Photo	Q26313896
Barn About 25 Metres South of Little Pagehurst	II	Thorn Road			25 March 1987	TQ7709843246; 51°09′40″N 0°31′53″E		1060700	Upload Photo	Q26313874
Barn About 40 Metres North East of Great Pagehurst Place	II	Thorn Road			22 August 1985	TQ7715943451; 51°09′46″N 0°31′56″E		1060699	Upload Photo	Q26313873
Barn About 45 Metres South East of Dourne Farmhouse	II	Thorn Road			25 March 1987	TQ7628342997; 51°09′33″N 0°31′11″E		1344389	Upload Photo	Q26628117
Dourne Farmhouse	II	Thorn Road			23 May 1967	TQ7626043057; 51°09′35″N 0°31′09″E		1054792	Upload Photo	Q26306444
Great Pagehurst Place	II	Thorn Road			25 July 1952	TQ7710343431; 51°09′46″N 0°31′53″E		1344388	Upload Photo	Q26628116
Little Pagehurst	II	Thorn Road			23 May 1967	TQ7711043288; 51°09′41″N 0°31′54″E		1054785	Upload Photo	Q26306438

== See also ==
- Grade I listed buildings in Kent
- Grade II* listed buildings in Kent

== Sources ==
- Newman, John (2012) [1969], Kent: West and the Weald, The Buildings of England, New Haven and London: Yale University Press, ISBN 978-0-300-18509-6
