= Llangrannog =

Village and community in Ceredigion, Wales

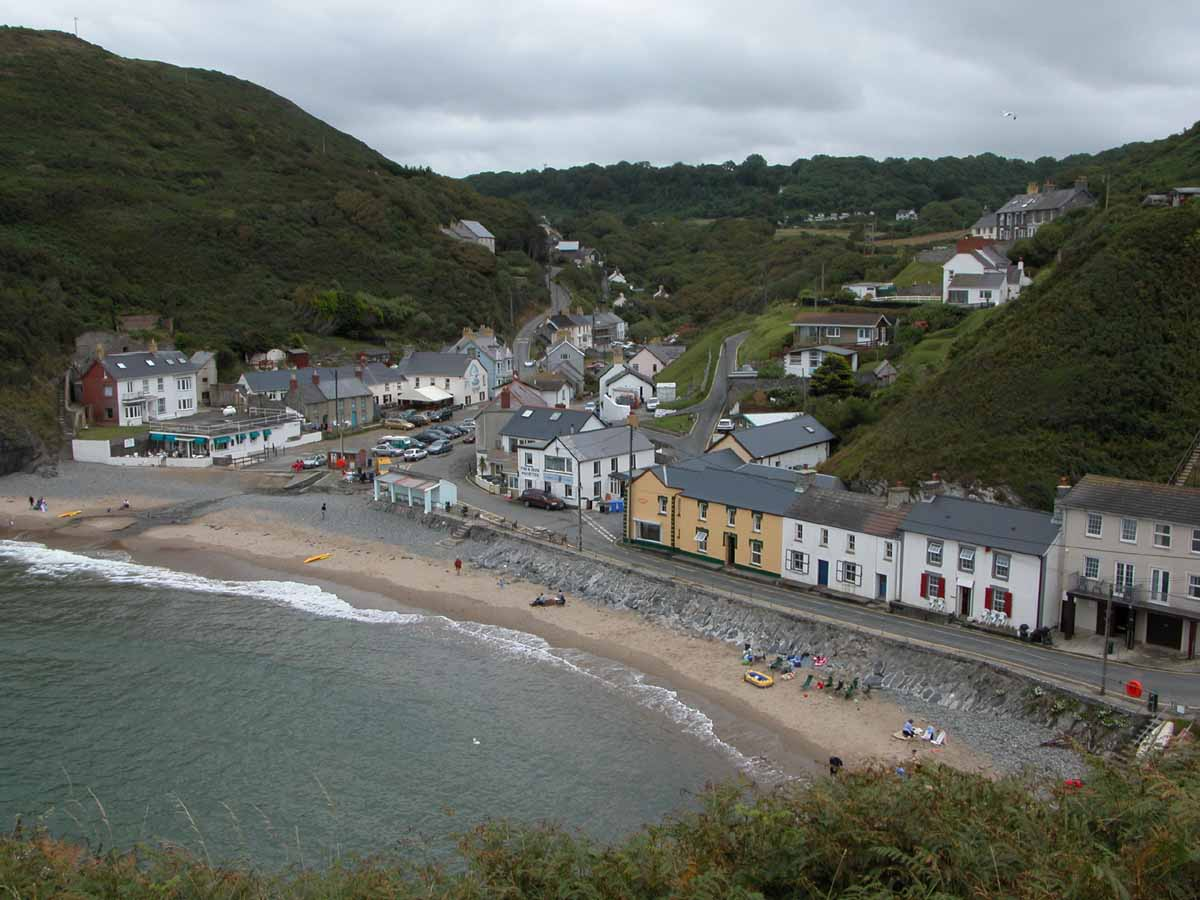
- Llangrannog from the west

- Location within Ceredigion
- Population: 775 (2011)
- OS grid reference: SN316540
- Principal area: Ceredigion
- Preserved county: Dyfed
- Country: Wales
- Sovereign state: United Kingdom
- Post town: Blaencelyn
- Postcode district: SA44
- Dialling code: 01239 654
- Police: Dyfed-Powys
- Fire: Mid and West Wales
- Ambulance: Welsh
- UK Parliament: Ceredigion Preseli
- Senedd Cymru – Welsh Parliament: Ceredigion Penfro
- List of places UK Wales Ceredigion 52.1587°N 4.4631°W Community map: Map of the community

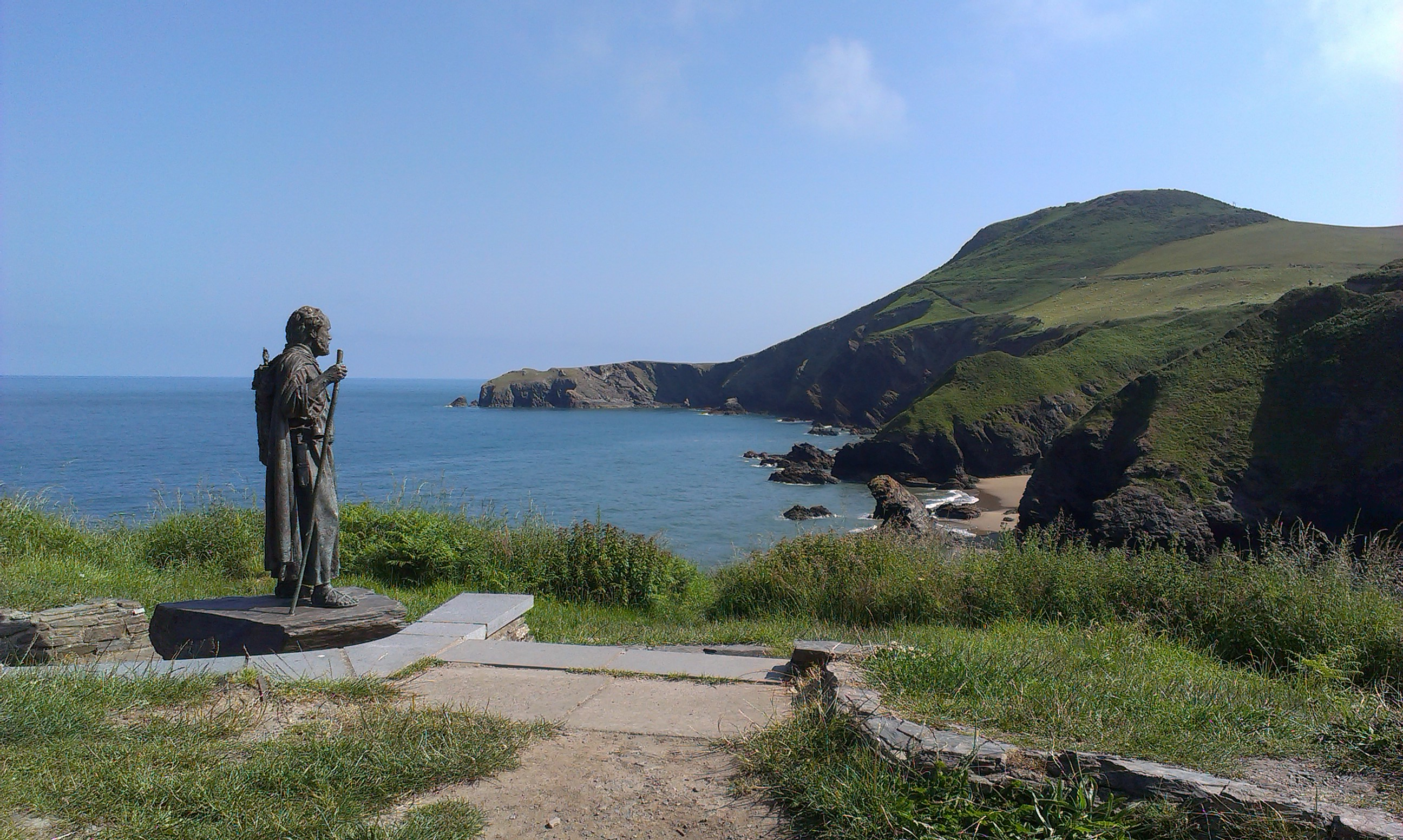
Statue of Saint Carannog in Llangrannog

Llangrannog (Welsh pronunciation: [ɬanˈgranɔg]; sometimes spelt as Llangranog) is a village and community in Ceredigion, Wales, 6 miles (10 km) southwest of New Quay. It lies in the narrow valley of the River Hawen, which falls as a waterfall near the middle of the village. Llangrannog is on the Wales Coast Path. The community contains the hamlet Pigeonsford.

== Demographics ==
=== Population ===
According to the 2011 census, Llangrannog's population was 775. This was a 2.6% decrease since the 796 people noted in 2001. It is estimated that Llangrannog's population decreased further to 759 in 2019.

=== Welsh language ===
The 2011 census showed 46.5% of the town's population could speak Welsh, a fall from 51.8% in 2001.

== Geography ==
The large rock between Llangrannog and Cilborth Beaches is Carreg Bica, a stack of Ordovician rock weathered by the sea, one of many along the coastline. A large piece of Carreg Bica fell away some years ago. Llangrannog's beach has received Blue Flag beach status. An RNLI lifeguard service is provided. Two streams flow down the beach to the sea - the Hawen and the smaller Nant Eisteddfa. There is a waterfall on the Hawen, known as Y Gerwn. Located within the community is the tiny island of Ynys Lochtyn.

== Legend ==
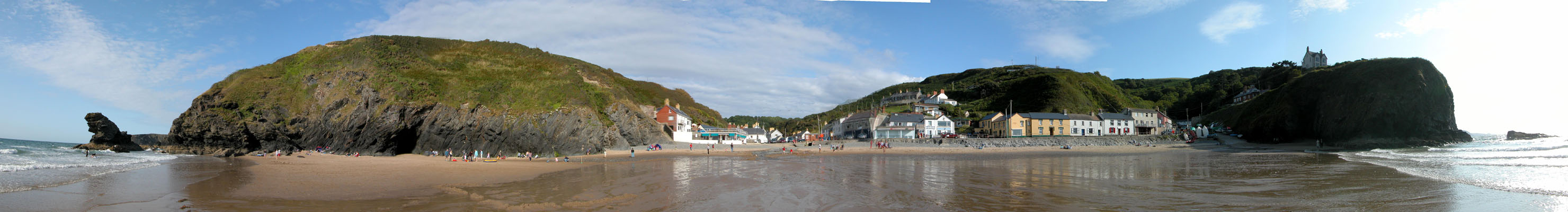
Carreg Bica viewed from the beach

According to legend, Carreg Bica (trans: Bica's rock)—the large sea-weathered stack of Ordovician rock on the beach—is the tooth of the giant Bica. He lived in Ceredigion and was forced to spit his tooth onto the beach when suffering a bad toothache. A simpler explanation is that the Welsh word Pica means pointed and after a feminine singular noun this would become Bica. So the rock's name is just Pointed Rock in Welsh.

== Notable people ==
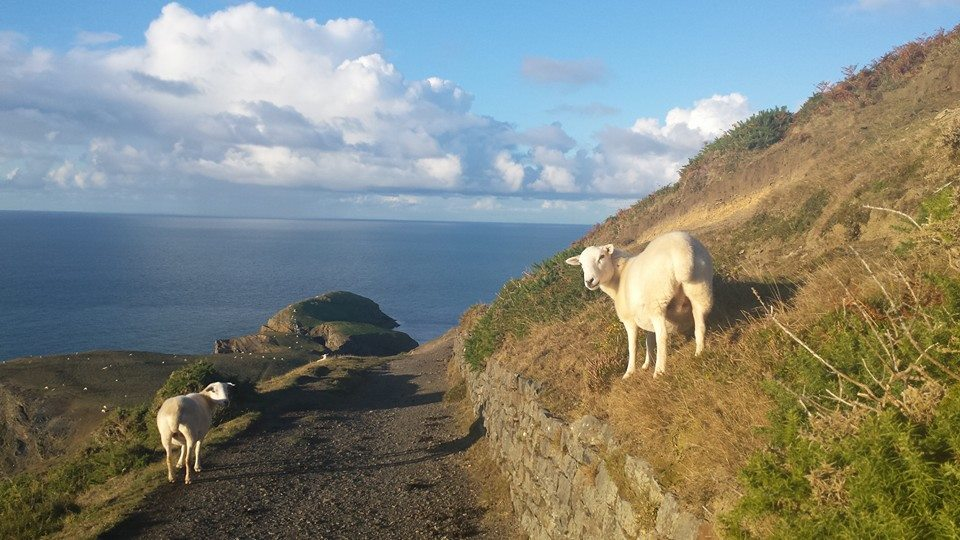
Wales Coast Path above the village

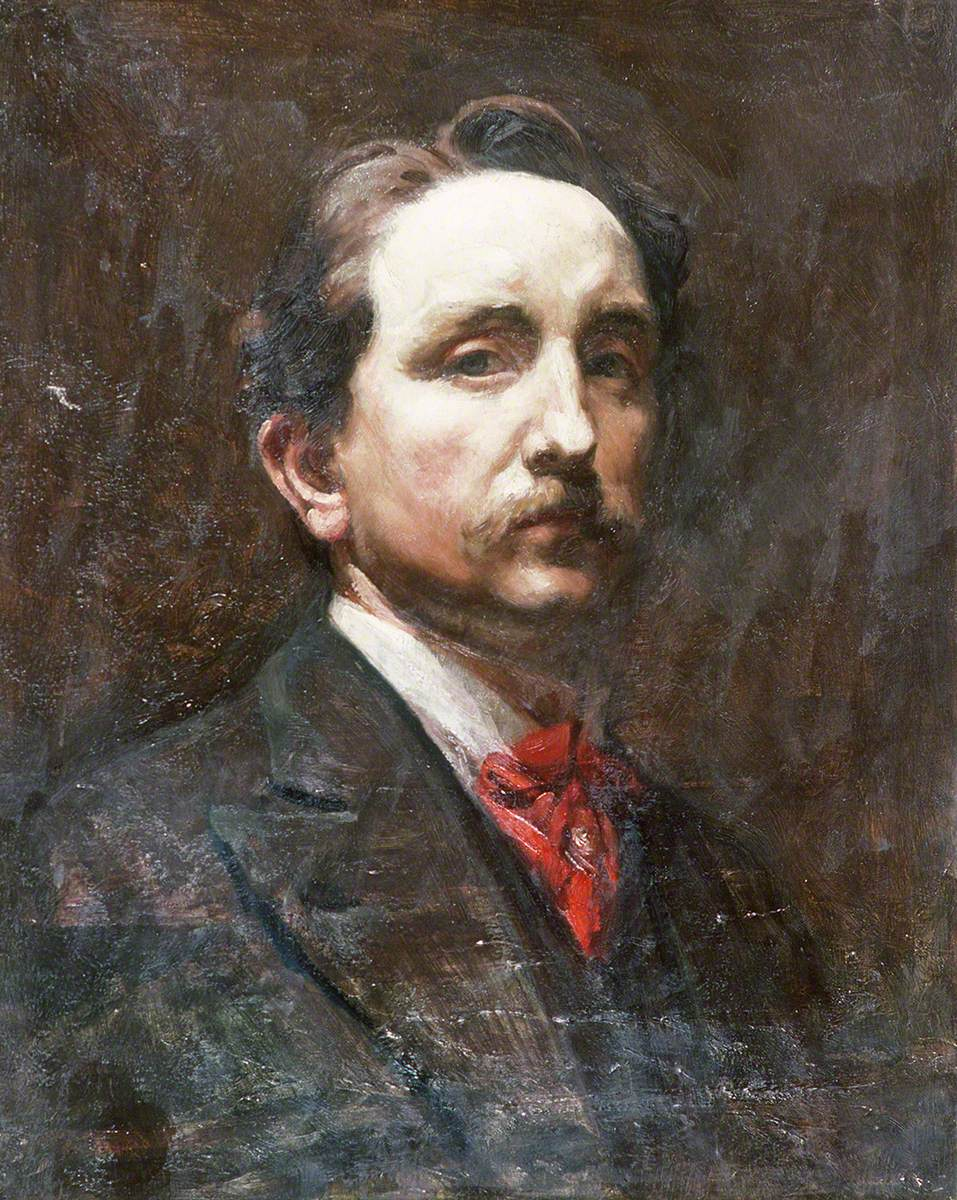
Self-portrait of Christopher Williams

- Sarah Jane Rees (1839–1916), was born in Llangrannog and is buried in the church yard. A precocious child, by the age of 15 she had learned navigation from her sea captain father and went on to obtain her Masters Certificate. She taught navigation in a school she founded to help local seamen better themselves. In 1865 she won the crown in the Aberystwyth National Eisteddfod under the bardic name of Cranogwen. She became a popular lay-preacher and eventually gave up school teaching to concentrate on preaching and on establishing the South Wales Women's Temperance Union in 1901 to counter the harm done by alcohol among the working classes.
- Edward Elgar (1857–1934), once spent a holiday in Llangrannog.
- Christopher Williams RBA (1873–1934), a Welsh artist, visited and painted here. His painting "Holidays - Village Girls at Llangrannog" is in the collection of the National Library of Wales.
- Dylan Thomas (1914–1953), visited Llangrannog whilst he was living in New Quay in 1944–45. He came to the Ship Inn with Tommy Herbert, the Aberaeron vet, and with Ira Jones, the World War One fighter ace.
- T. Llew Jones (1915 in Pentrecwrt – 2009), a Welsh language author.
- J. Geraint Jenkins (1929–2009), a Welsh maritime historian and historian of rural crafts.
- Beti George (born 1939 in Coed-y-bryn), a Welsh broadcaster on TV and radio.

== Sport and leisure ==
Crannog, Llangrannog's football team, play in the Ceredigion League.

== Bibliography ==
- Jenkins, J. Geraint. Llangrannog. Llangrannog Community Council.
- Davies, Mervyn. The Story of Llangrannog.
