= Staplehurst =

Village in Kent, England

Coordinates: 51.164°N 0.553°E

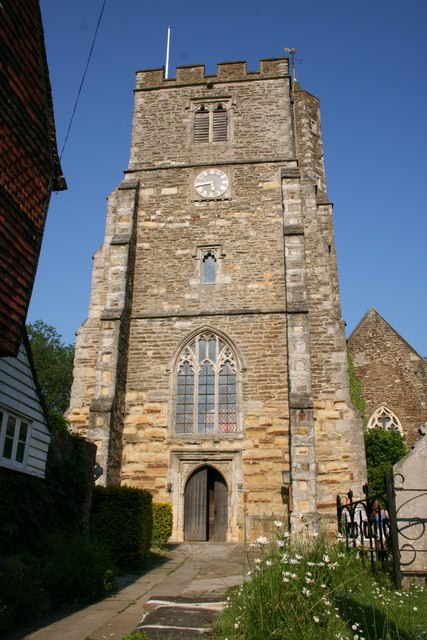
- All Saints' Church

- Location within Kent
- Population: 6,003 (2001) 5,947 (2011 Census) 6,700 (Parish Council)
- District: Maidstone
- Shire county: Kent
- Region: South East
- Country: England
- Sovereign state: United Kingdom
- Post town: Tonbridge
- Postcode district: TN12
- Dialling code: 01580
- Police: Kent
- Fire: Kent
- Ambulance: South East Coast
- UK Parliament: Weald of Kent

Staplehurst /ˈsteɪpəlhɜːrst/ is a village and civil parish in the borough of Maidstone in Kent, England, 9 miles (14 km) south of the town of Maidstone and with a population of 6,700. The village lies on the route of a Roman road, which is now incorporated into the course of the A229. The name Staplehurst comes from the Old English 'stapol' meaning a 'post, pillar' and 'hyrst', as a 'wooded hill'; therefore, 'wooded-hill at a post', a possible reference to a boundary marker at the position of All Saints' church atop the hill along the road from Maidstone to Cranbrook. The parish includes the hamlet of Hawkenbury.

== History ==
The first written mention of Staplehurst was in 1242 in a Tax list, whilst All Saints' Church is believed to date back to the 12th century. The village was initially a series of hamlets and farmsteads set around local manors including Loddenden Manor, which still stands as a private residence in the heart of the village and dates back to the 16th century. With time these hamlets joined up to form the village.

In the early 19th century, Staplehurst was often visited by invalids seeking recuperation, especially those from Romney Marsh and East Kent, apparently attracted by the purity of the air.

The Staplehurst rail crash, in 1865,is a significant event in the history of the village. Charles Dickens, who was on board, was uninjured, but affected by the incident for the rest of his life.

In 2003, Staplehurst won the Kent Village of the Year Competition.

Elderden Farm near Staplehurst was a centre of police investigations following the Securitas depot robbery in 2006.

== Governance ==
Staplehurst is governed by Staplehurst Parish Council, Maidstone Borough Council, and Kent County Council.

== Culture and community ==
=== Religion ===
The 12th-century Anglican parish church, All Saints', is located at the highest point in the village. It belongs to the Diocese of Canterbury. It is a Grade I listed building. The village also has a United Reformed Church, a Free church and a Strict Baptist chapel.

The United Reformed Church was formerly a Congregational church before the merger with the Presbyterians in 1972. The first pastor was Daniel Poyntell, who had been the Rector of Staplehurst Parish Church until he was ejected from the Church of England in 1662 for nonconformity. During his pastorship, and for many years afterwards, it was a Presbyterian church. The foundation of the present building was laid in 1825.

The Strict Baptist chapel has been used a place of worship for Baptists since 1751, apparently having previously been used as a barn. The original congregation were General Baptists and were a continuation of the old Spilshill church that was formed around 1640. In 1838 the building was sold to the Particular Baptists.

The Free Church began in 1969 when a group began meeting for worship in homes throughout the village. The first church building was purchased in 1975 and the old Village Hall was purchased in 1989. The church was demolished in 2006 to make way for a new building which was completed in December 2012.

=== Education ===
Staplehurst School, the village primary school, is located on Gybbon Rise, near the village centre shops. Around 440 pupils are taught in 18 classrooms. The school was originally housed in the stone buildings off the A229 and moved to the new site when the population of the village grew in the 1980s. The old school then became the village community centre. The village also has a small library.

=== Transport ===
Staplehurst railway station is on the South Eastern Main Line from Ashford International railway station to London Charing Cross and London Cannon Street, via Tonbridge. It is also the main station for commuters from Cranbrook, Hawkhurst, Sissinghurst and other nearby villages. Before the completion of High Speed 1, the line was also used by Eurostar trains.

=== Sport and recreation ===
Staplehurst Monarchs Football Club, founded in 1893, compete in the Southern Counties East Football League. The club also has junior and women's teams and plays at Jubilee Field in the village.

The village is also home to Staplehurst Cricket and Tennis club which has 450 members.

=== Media ===
Local news and television programmes are provided by BBC South East and ITV Meridian. Television signals are received from either the Bluebell Hill or Tunbridge Wells TV transmitters. BBC London and ITV London can also be received from the Crystal Palace TV transmitter.

Staplehurst's local radio stations are BBC Radio Kent, Heart South, Gold and KMFM Ashford covers the village.

Newspapers providing local news include the Ashford Herald, Kentish Express and yourashford.

== Economy ==
Whilst Staplehurst has transport links to London, Maidstone and Tunbridge Wells, it is also home to a number of local businesses located in the industrial park near the station as well as the headquarters of electrical engineering firm Magnetic Shields in the north of the village.

Towards the south of the village the parade and historic 'village Heart' is home to a number of eateries and independent shops including a butcher, wine retailer, optician, hairdressers, local gift shop, and a public house dating back to the 18th century, the King's Head.

== Notable people ==
- Reginald Poynton Baker (1896–1985), movie producer, owner of Loddenden Manor until 1954.
- Robert Gregg Bury (1869–1951), clergyman and classicist, curate at All Saints' Church (1895–98).
- Charlie Cramp (1876–1933), trade unionist and Labour Party activist, was born in Staplehurst.
- Chris Etheridge (living), ten-time British sidecarcross champion.
- Harry Hill (born 1964), comedian, grew up in Staplehurst, attending Staplehurst Primary School, High Weald Academy and Cranbrook School.
- William Malim (1533–1594), academic, schoolmaster and writer in Latin, was born in Staplehurst.
- Nigel McGuinness (born 1976), former professional wrestler, grew up in Staplehurst.
- Gordon Thomson (1884–1953), Olympic rower (1908), died in Staplehurst.

== See also ==
- Listed buildings in Staplehurst, Kent
