= River Hawen =

Stream in Ceredigion, Wales

Coordinates: 52.15999°N 4.47115°W

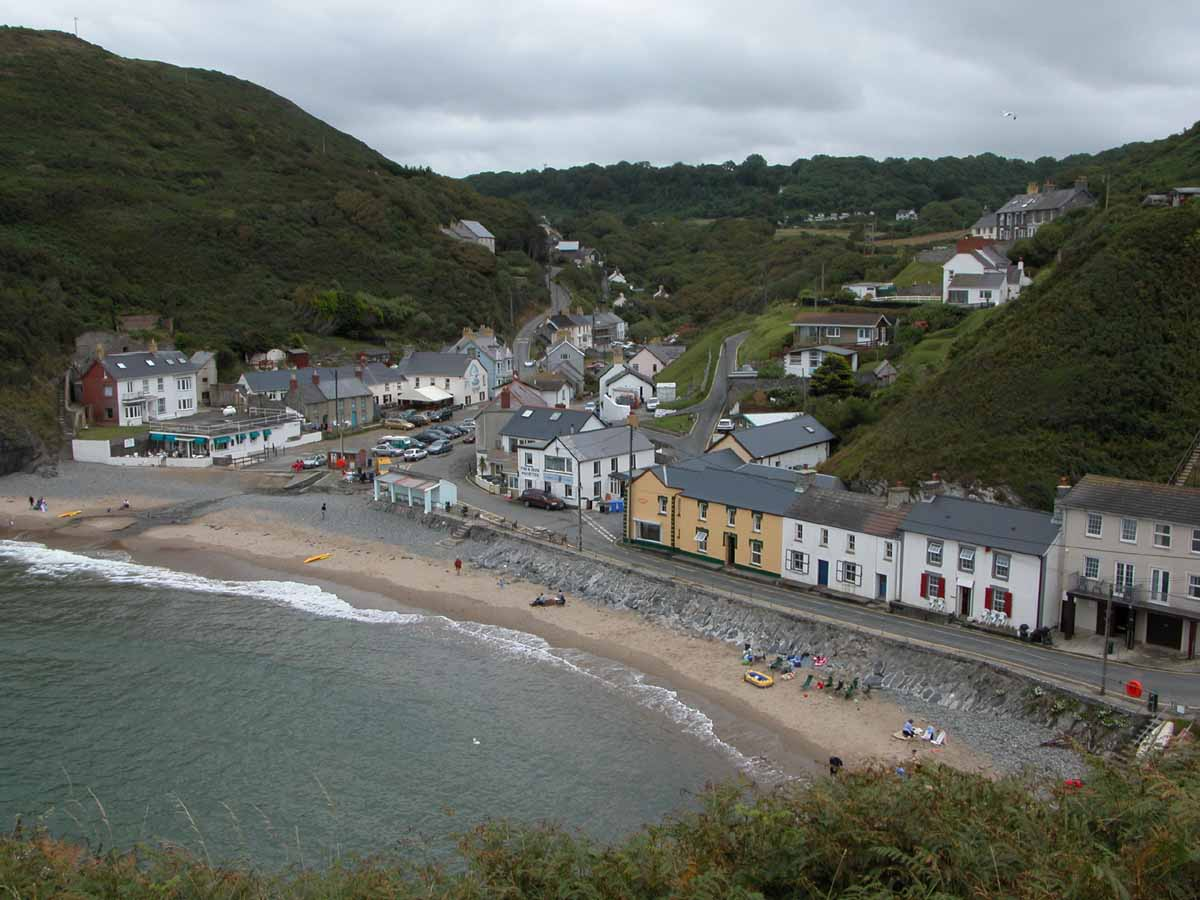
Llangrannog and the v-shaped valley

The River Hawen (Welsh pronunciation: [ˈhau̯ɛn]; Welsh: Nant Hawen) is the main stream that flows through Llangrannog, Ceredigion, Wales into Cardigan Bay. It falls as a waterfall near the centre of the village, then flows to the beach through a v-shaped valley. Shortly after passing the waterfall, it is joined by the smaller Nant Ddu from the south.
