= List of electoral wards in Northamptonshire =

This is a list of electoral divisions and wards in the ceremonial county of Northamptonshire in the East Midlands. All changes since the re-organisation of local government following the passing of the Local Government Act 1972 are shown. The number of councillors elected for each electoral division or ward is shown in brackets.

== Unitary authorities ==
=== North Northamptonshire ===
==== 2021–25 ====
Wards from 1 April 2021 (elected 6 May 2021) to 1 May 2025:

1. Brickhill & Queensway (3)
2. Burton & Broughton (3)
3. Clover Hill (3)
4. Corby Rural (3)
5. Corby West (3)
6. Croyland & Swanspool (3)
7. Desborough (3)
8. Earls Barton (3)
9. Finedon (3)
10. Hatton Park (3)
11. Higham Ferrers (3)
12. Irchester (3)
13. Irthlingborough (3)
14. Ise (3)
15. Kingswood (3)
16. Lloyds (3)
17. Northall (3)
18. Oakley (3)
19. Oundle (3)
20. Raunds (3)
21. Rothwell & Mawsley (3)
22. Rushden Pemberton West (3)
23. Rushden South (3)
24. Thrapston (3)
25. Wicksteed (3)
26. Windmill (3)

==== 2025–present ====
Wards from 1 May 2025 until present:

1. Avondale Grange (1)
2. Barton Seagrave & Burton Latimer (3)
3. Brickhill & Queensway (3)
4. Corby West (3)
5. Croyland & Swanspool (2)
6. Desborough (3)
7. Earls Barton (2)
8. Finedon (1)
9. Geddington & Stanion (1)
10. Gretton & Weldon (2)
11. Hatton Park (3)
12. Higham Ferrers (2)
13. Irchester (3)
14. Irthlingborough (2)
15. Ise (2)
16. Kettering Central (2)
17. Kettering North (2)
18. Kingswood (3)
19. Lloyds & Corby Village (2)
20. Oakley (3)
21. Oundle (3)
22. Pemberton (2)
23. Pipers Hill (1)
24. Raunds (3)
25. Rothwell & Mawsley (3)
26. Rushden Lakes (2)
27. Rushden South (2)
28. St Michael (1)
29. St Peter (1)
30. Thrapston (3)
31. Victoria (2)

=== West Northamptonshire ===
==== 2021–25 ====
Wards from 1 April 2021 (elected 6 May 2021) to 1 May 2025:

1. Abington & Phippsville (3)
2. Billing & Rectory Farm (3)
3. Boothville & Parklands (3)
4. Brackley (3)
5. Braunston & Crick (3)
6. Brixworth (3)
7. Bugbrooke (3)
8. Castle (3)
9. Dallington Spencer (3)
10. Daventry East (3)
11. Daventry West (3)
12. Deanshanger (3)
13. Delapre & Rushmere (3)
14. Duston East (3)
15. Duston West & St Crispin (3)
16. East Hunsbury & Shelfleys (3)
17. Hackleton & Grange Park (3)
18. Headlands (3)
19. Kingsthorpe North (3)
20. Kingsthorpe South (3)
21. Long Buckby (3)
22. Middleton Cheney (3)
23. Moulton (3)
24. Nene Valley (3)
25. Riverside Park (3)
26. Silverstone (3)
27. Sixfields (3)
28. St George (3)
29. Talavera (3)
30. Towcester & Roade (3)
31. Woodford & Weedon (3)

==== 2025–present ====
Wards from 1 May 2025 until present:

1. Abington & Phippsville (2)
2. Billing (2)
3. Blackthorn & Rectory Farm (2)
4. Brackley (3)
5. Braunston & Crick (2)
6. Brixworth (1)
7. Campion (2)
8. Castle (3)
9. Cogenhoe & The Houghtons (1)
10. Dallington Spencer (3)
11. Daventry North East (1)
12. Daventry North West (1)
13. Daventry South (3)
14. Deanshanger & Paulerspury (2)
15. Duston (3)
16. Far Cotton, Delapre & Briar Hill (3)
17. Hackleton & Roade (2)
18. Headlands (3)
19. Hunsbury (3)
20. Kingsley & Semilong (2)
21. Kingsthorpe North (3)
22. Kingsthorpe South (2)
23. Long Buckby (2)
24. Middleton Cheney (2)
25. Moulton (3)
26. Naseby (1)
27. Nene Valley (3)
28. Parklands (1)
29. Rural North East (1)
30. Rural South Northamptonshire (3)
31. Talavera (2)
32. Towcester (3)
33. Upton (2)
34. Weston Favell & Abington Vale (2)
35. Woodford & Weedon (2)

== Former county council ==
=== Northamptonshire ===
Electoral Divisions from 1 April 1974 (first election 12 April 1973) to 7 May 1981:

1. Blisworth (1)
2. Brackley (1)
3. Brixworth No. 1 (Brixworth) (1)
4. Brixworth No. 2 (1)
5. Brixworth No. 3 (1)
6. Burton Latimer (1)
7. Corby (Beanfield East) (1)
8. Corby (Beanfield West) (1)
9. Corby (Forest Gate) (1)
10. Corby (Lodge Park) (1)
11. Corby (Old Town) (1)
12. Corby (Pen Green) (1)
13. Corby (Studfall) (1)
14. Corby (Town Centre) (1)
15. Daventry (2)
16. Daventry Rural No. 1 (Braunston) (1)
17. Daventry Rural No. 2 (Byfield) (1)
18. Daventry Rural No. 3 (Crick) (1)
19. Daventry Rural No. 4 (Weedon Bec) (1)
20. Daventry Rural No. 5 (1)
21. Desborough (1)
22. Higham Ferrers (1)
23. Irthlingborough (1)
24. Kettering No. 1 (Avondale) (1)
25. Kettering No. 2 (Barton) (1)
26. Kettering No. 3 (Kingsley) (1)
27. Kettering No. 4 (Northfield) (1)
28. Kettering No. 5 (Pipers Hill) (1)
29. Kettering No. 6 (St Peters) (1)
30. Kettering No. 7 (Warkton) (1)
31. Kettering No. 8 (1)
32. Kettering Rural No. 1 (Pytchley) (1)
33. Kettering Rural No. 2 (1)
34. Kettering Rural No. 3 (1)
35. Kings Sutton (1)
36. Middleton Cheney (1)
37. Northampton No. 1 (Abington) (2)
38. Northampton No. 2 (Castle) (2)
39. Northampton No. 3 (Dallington) (2)
40. Northampton No. 4 (Delapre) (2)
41. Northampton No. 5 (Kingsthorpe) (2)
42. Northampton No. 6 (Park) (2)
43. Northampton No. 7 (St Crispin) (2)
44. Northampton No. 8 (St David) (2)
45. Northampton No. 9 (St George) (2)
46. Northampton No. 10 (2)
47. Northampton No. 11 (2)
48. Northampton No. 12 (2)
49. Northampton Rural No. 1 (1)
50. Northampton Rural No. 2 (1)
51. Northampton Rural No. 3 (1)
52. Northampton Rural No. 4 (1)
53. Oundle (1)
54. Oundle & Thrapston Rural No. 1 (1)
55. Oundle & Thrapston Rural No. 2 (1)
56. Oundle & Thrapston Rural No. 3 (1)
57. Potterspury (1)
58. Raunds (1)
59. Rothwell (1)
60. Rushden (East) (1)
61. Rushden (North) (1)
62. Rushden (South) (1)
63. Rushden (West) (1)
64. Silverstone (1)
65. Syresham (1)
66. Towcester (1)
67. Wellingborough (Castle) (1)
68. Wellingborough (Croyland) (1)
69. Wellingborough (Eastfield) (1)
70. Wellingborough (Finedon) (1)
71. Wellingborough (Queensway) (1)
72. Wellingborough (Redwell) (1)
73. Wellingborough (Swanspool) (1)
74. Wellingborough Rural No. 1 (Earls B (1)
75. Wellingborough Rural No. 2 (Harrowd (1)
76. Wellingborough Rural No. 3 (1)
77. Wellingborough Rural No. 4 (1)

Electoral Divisions from 7 May 1981 to 7 June 2001:

1. Abington (1)
2. Billing (1)
3. Boughton Green (1)
4. Brackley (1)
5. Braunston (1)
6. Brixworth (1)
7. Bugbrooke (1)
8. Burton (1)
9. Corby Rural (1)
10. Corby South (1)
11. Corby Town Centre (1)
12. Croyland (1)
13. Dallington & Kings Heath (1)
14. Daventry East (1)
15. Daventry West (1)
16. Deanshanger (1)
17. Delapre (1)
18. Desborough (1)
19. Earls Barton (1)
20. Finedom (1)
21. Grange (1)
22. Hackleton (1)
23. Hazelwood (1)
24. Headlands (1)
25. Helmdom (1)
26. Higham Ferrers (1)
27. Irchester (1)
28. Irthlingborough (1)
29. Ise (1)
30. Kettering Park (1)
31. Kettering Rural (1)
32. Kingsthorpe (1)
33. Kingswood (1)
34. Links (1)
35. Lodge Park (1)
36. Long Buckby (1)
37. Lumbertubs (1)
38. Middleton Cheney (1)
39. Moulton (1)
40. Nene Valley (1)
41. New Duston (1)
42. Northampton Castle (1)
43. Northampton Park (1)
44. Northampton South (1)
45. Northfield (1)
46. Old Duston (1)
47. Oundle (1)
48. Queensway (1)
49. Raunds (1)
50. Redwell (1)
51. Roade (1)
52. Rothwell (1)
53. Rushden East (1)
54. Rushden South (1)
55. Rushden West (1)
56. Shire Lodge (1)
57. St Alban (1)
58. St Andrews/St Marys (1)
59. St Crispin (1)
60. St George (1)
61. Swanspool (1)
62. Thorplands (1)
63. Thrapston (1)
64. Towcester (1)
65. Weedon Bec (1)
66. Welford (1)
67. Wellboro Castle (1)
68. Weston (1)

Electoral Divisions from 7 June 2001 to 2 May 2013:

1. Abington (1)
2. Billing (1)
3. Boughton Green (1)
4. Brackley East (1)
5. Brackley West (1)
6. Brambleside (1)
7. Braunston (1)
8. Brixworth (1)
9. Bugbrooke (1)
10. Burton (1)
11. Castle (1)
12. Central (1)
13. Corby Rural (1)
14. Croyland (1)
15. Danesholme (1)
16. Daventry East (1)
17. Daventry West (1)
18. Deanshanger (1)
19. Delapre (1)
20. Desborough (1)
21. Earls Barton (1)
22. East Hunsbury (1)
23. Eastfield (1)
24. Ecton Brook (1)
25. Finedon (1)
26. Grange (1)
27. Greens Norton (1)
28. Hackleton (1)
29. Headlands (1)
30. Hemmingwell (1)
31. Higham Ferrers (1)
32. Irchester (1)
33. Irthlingborough (1)
34. Ise (1)
35. Kettering Central (1)
36. Kettering Rural (1)
37. Kingsley (1)
38. Kingsthorpe (1)
39. Kingswood (1)
40. Lloyds (1)
41. Long Buckby (1)
42. Lumbertubs (1)
43. Middleton Cheney (1)
44. Moulton (1)
45. Nene Valley (1)
46. New Duston (1)
47. Old Duston (1)
48. Oundle (1)
49. Parklands (1)
50. Prebendal (1)
51. Queensway (1)
52. Raunds (1)
53. Redwell (1)
54. Roade (1)
55. Rothwell (1)
56. Rushden East (1)
57. Rushden South (1)
58. Rushden West (1)
59. Shire Lodge (1)
60. Spencer (1)
61. St Andrew's & St Peter's (1)
62. St Crispin (1)
63. St David (1)
64. St James (1)
65. Swanspool (1)
66. Thorplands (1)
67. Thrapston (1)
68. Towcester (1)
69. Uplands (1)
70. West Hunsbury (1)
71. Weston (1)
72. Wicksteed (1)
73. Woodford & Weedon (1)

Electoral Divisions from 2 May 2013 to 1 April 2021:

1. Abington & Phippsville (1)
2. Billing & Rectory Farm (1)
3. Boothville & Parklands (1)
4. Brackley (1)
5. Braunston & Crick (1)
6. Brickhill & Queensway (1)
7. Brixworth (1)
8. Bugbrooke (1)
9. Burton & Broughton (1)
10. Castle (1)
11. Clover Hill (1)
12. Corby Rural (1)
13. Corby West (1)
14. Croyland & Swanspool (1)
15. Dallington Spencer (1)
16. Daventry East (1)
17. Daventry West (1)
18. Deanshanger (1)
19. Delapre & Rushmere (1)
20. Desborough (1)
21. Duston East (1)
22. Duston West & St Crispin (1)
23. Earls Barton (1)
24. East Hunsbury & Shelfleys (1)
25. Finedon (1)
26. Hackleton & Grange Park (1)
27. Hatton Park (1)
28. Headlands (1)
29. Higham Ferrers (1) †
30. Irchester (1)
31. Irthlingborough (1) †
32. Ise (1)
33. Kingsthorpe North (1)
34. Kingsthorpe South (1)
35. Kingswood (1)
36. Lloyds (1)
37. Long Buckby (1)
38. Middleton Cheney (1)
39. Moulton (1)
40. Nene Valley (1)
41. Northall (1)
42. Oakley (1)
43. Oundle (1)
44. Raunds (1) †
45. Riverside Park (1)
46. Rothwell & Mawsley (1)
47. Rushden Pemberton West (1)
48. Rushden South (1)
49. Silverstone (1)
50. Sixfields (1)
51. St George (1)
52. Talavera (1)
53. Thrapston (1)
54. Towcester & Roade (1)
55. Wicksteed (1)
56. Windmill (1)
57. Woodford & Weedon (1)

† minor boundary changes in 2017

== Former district councils ==
=== Corby ===
Wards from 1 April 1974 (first election 7 June 1973) to 6 May 1976:

Wards from 6 May 1976 to 6 May 1999:

1. Central (3)
2. Danesholme (3)
3. East (2)
4. Hazelwood (3)
5. Kingswood (3)
6. Lloyds (3)
7. Lodge Park (3)
8. Rural East (1)
9. Rural North (1)
10. Rural West (1)
11. Shire Lodge (2)
12. West (2)

Wards from 6 May 1999 to 3 May 2007:

1. Central (3)
2. Danesholme (3)
3. East (2)
4. Hazelwood (3)
5. Hillside (1)
6. Kingswood (3)
7. Lloyds (3)
8. Lodge Park (3)
9. Rural East (2)
10. Rural North (1)
11. Rural West (1)
12. Shire Lodge (2)
13. West (2)

Wards from 3 May 2007 to 7 May 2015:

1. Central (1)
2. Beanfield (2)
3. Danesholme (2)
4. East (3)
5. Exeter (1)
6. Great Oakley (1)
7. Kingswood (3)
8. Lodge Park (2)
9. Oakley Vale (3)
10. Rowlett (2)
11. Rural West (1)
12. Shire Lodge (2)
13. Stanion & Corby Village (2)
14. Tower Hill (2)
15. Weldon & Gretton (2)

Wards from 7 May 2015 to 1 April 2021:

1. Beanfield (3)
2. Central (2)
3. Danesholme (2)
4. Kingswood & Hazel Leys (3)
5. Lloyds (3)
6. Lodge Park (3)
7. Oakley North (2)
8. Oakley South (3)
9. Rowlett (2)
10. Rural West (1)
11. Stanion & Corby Village (2)
12. Weldon & Gretton (3)

=== Daventry ===
Wards from 1 April 1974 (first election 7 June 1973) to 3 May 1979:

Wards from 3 May 1979 to 6 May 1999:

Wards from 6 May 1999 to 3 May 2012:

1. Abbey North (3)
2. Abbey South (2)
3. Badby (1)
4. Barby & Kilsby (2)
5. Boughton & Pitsford (1)
6. Brampton (1)
7. Braunston (1)
8. Brixworth (3)
9. Byfield (1)
10. Clipston (1)
11. Crick (1)
12. Drayton (3)
13. Flore (1)
14. Hill (3)
15. Long Buckby (2)
16. Moulton (2)
17. Ravensthorpe (1)
18. Spratton (1)
19. Walgrave (1)
20. Weedon (2)
21. Welford (1)
22. West Haddon & Guilsborough (1)
23. Woodford (2)
24. Yelvertoft (1)

Wards from 3 May 2012 to 1 April 2021:

1. Abbey North (3)
2. Abbey South (3)
3. Barby & Kilsby (2)
4. Braunston & Welton (1)
5. Brixworth (3)
6. Drayton (3)
7. Hill (3)
8. Long Buckby (3)
9. Moulton (2)
10. Ravensthorpe (1)
11. Spratton (2)
12. Walgrave (1)
13. Weedon (3)
14. Welford (2)
15. Woodford (3)
16. Yelvertoft (1)

=== East Northamptonshire ===
Wards from 1 April 1974 (first election 7 June 1973) to 3 May 1979:

1. Barnwell (1)
2. Brigstock (1)
3. Drayton (1)
4. Forest (1)
5. Higham Ferrers (3)
6. Irthlingborough (3)
7. Kings Cliffe (1)
8. Lower Nene (1)
9. Margaret Beaufort (1)
10. Oundle (3)
11. Raunds (4)
12. Ringstead (1)
13. Rushden East (3)
14. Rushden North (3)
15. Rushden South (3)
16. Rushden West (3)
17. Thrapston (2)
18. Willibrook (1)
19. Woodford (1)

Wards from 3 May 1979 to 6 May 1999:

1. Barnwell (1)
2. Brigstock (1)
3. Drayton (1)
4. Forest (1)
5. Higham Ferrers (3)
6. Irthlingborough (3)
7. Kings Cliffe (1)
8. Lower Nene (1)
9. Margaret Beaufort (1)
10. Oundle (2)
11. Raunds (3)
12. Ringstead (1)
13. Rushden East (3)
14. Rushden North (3)
15. Rushden South (3)
16. Rushden West (3)
17. Stanwick (1)
18. Thrapston (1)
19. Willibrook (2)
20. Woodford (1)

Wards from 6 May 1999 to 3 May 2007:

1. Barnwell (1)
2. Dryden (1)
3. Fineshade (1)
4. Higham Ferrers (3)
5. Irthlingborough (3)
6. King's Forest (1)
7. Lower Nene (1)
8. Lyveden (1)
9. Oundle (2)
10. Prebendal (1)
11. Raunds Saxon (2)
12. Raunds Windmill (2)
13. Ringstead (1)
14. Rushden East (3)
15. Rushden North (3)
16. Rushden South (3)
17. Rushden West (3)
18. Stanwick (1)
19. Thrapston (2)
20. Woodford (1)

Wards from 3 May 2007 to 1 April 2021:

1. Barnwell (1)
2. Fineshade (1)
3. Higham Ferrers Chichele (2) †
4. Higham Ferrers Lancaster (2) †
5. Irthlingborough John Pyel (2) †
6. Irthlingborough Waterloo (2) †
7. King's Forest (1)
8. Lower Nene (1)
9. Lyveden (1)
10. Oundle (3)
11. Prebendal (1)
12. Raunds Saxon (2) †
13. Raunds Windmill (2) †
14. Rushden Bates (2) †
15. Rushden Hayden (3) †
16. Rushden Pemberton (3) †
17. Rushden Sartoris (2) †
18. Rushden Spencer (3)
19. Stanwick (1) †
20. Thrapston Lakes (2) †
21. Thrapston Market (2) †
22. Woodford (1)

† minor boundary changes in 2015

=== Kettering ===
Wards from 1 April 1974 (first election 7 June 1973) to 3 May 1979:

Wards from 3 May 1979 to 6 May 1999:

Wards from 6 May 1999 to 3 May 2007:

1. All Saints (2)
2. Avondale (2)
3. Barton (2)
4. Brambleside (2)
5. Buccleuch (1)
6. Latimer (2)
7. Loatland (2)
8. Millbrook (2)
9. Pipers Hill (2)
10. Plessy (2)
11. Queen Eleanor (1)
12. St Andrew's (3)
13. St Giles (2)
14. St Mary's (3)
15. St Michael's (2)
16. St Peter's (2)
17. Slade (2)
18. Spinney (2)
19. Tresham (2)
20. Trinity (2)
21. Warkton (2)
22. Welland (1)
23. Wicksteed (2)

Wards from 3 May 2007 to 1 April 2021:

1. All Saints (3)
2. Avondale Grange (2)
3. Barton (2)
4. Brambleside (2)
5. Burton Latimer (3)
6. Desborough Loatland (2)
7. Desborough St Giles (2)
8. Ise Lodge (3)
9. Northfield (1)
10. Pipers Hill (2)
11. Queen Eleanor & Buccleuch (1)
12. Rothwell (3)
13. Slade (2)
14. St Michael's & Wicksteed (3)
15. St Peter's (2)
16. Welland (1)
17. William Knibb (2)

=== Northampton ===
Wards from 1 April 1974 (first election 7 June 1973) to 3 May 1979:

Wards from 3 May 1979 to 6 May 1999:

Wards from 6 May 1999 to 5 May 2011:

1. Abington (2)
2. Billing (2)
3. Boughton Green (3)
4. Castle (2)
5. Delapre (2)
6. East Hunsbury (2)
7. Eastfield (2)
8. Ecton Brook (2)
9. Headlands (2)
10. Kingsley (2)
11. Kingsthorpe (2)
12. Lumbertubs (2)
13. Nene Valley (2)
14. New Duston (2)
15. Old Duston (2)
16. Parklands (2)
17. St Crispin (2)
18. St David (2)
19. St James (2)
20. Spencer (2)
21. Thorplands (2)
22. West Hunsbury (2)
23. Weston (2)

Wards from 5 May 2011 to 1 April 2021:

1. Abington (2)
2. Billing (2)
3. Boothville (1)
4. Brookside (1)
5. Castle (3)
6. Delapre & Briar Hill (3)
7. East Hunsbury (2)
8. Eastfield (1)
9. Headlands (1)
10. Kings Heath (1)
11. Kingsley (1)
12. Kingsthorpe (1)
13. Nene Valley (2)
14. New Duston (2)
15. Obelisk (1)
16. Old Duston (2)
17. Park (1)
18. Parklands (1)
19. Phippsville (1)
20. Rectory Farm (1)
21. Riverside (1)
22. Rushmills (1)
23. Semilong (1)
24. Spencer (1)
25. Spring Park (1)
26. St David's (1)
27. St James (1)
28. Sunnyside (1)
29. Talavera (2)
30. Trinity (1)
31. Upton (2)
32. West Hunsbury (1)
33. Westone (1)

=== South Northamptonshire ===
Wards from 1 April 1974 (first election 7 June 1973) to 6 May 1976:

Wards from 6 May 1976 to 6 May 1999:

Wards from 6 May 1999 to 3 May 2007:

1. Astwell (1)
2. Blakesley (1)
3. Blisworth (1)
4. Brackley East (2)
5. Brackley South (2)
6. Brackley West (2)
7. Chase (2)
8. Cogenhoe (1)
9. Cosgrove (1)
10. Cote (1)
11. Courteenhall (2)
12. Deanshanger (2)
13. Downs (2)
14. Grafton (1)
15. Grange (1)
16. Harpole (1)
17. Heyford (1)
18. Kings Sutton (1)
19. Kingthorn (1)
20. Little Brook (1)
21. Middleton Cheney (2)
22. Salcey (1)
23. Silverstone (1)
24. Steane (1)
25. Tove (1)
26. Towcester Brook (2)
27. Towcester Mill (2)
28. Wardoun (2)
29. Washington (1)
30. Whittlewood (1)
31. Yardley (1)

Wards from 3 May 2007 to 1 April 2021:

1. Astwell (1)
2. Blakesley & Cote (2)
3. Blisworth & Roade (2)
4. Brackley East (2)
5. Brackley South (2)
6. Brackley West (2)
7. Brafield & Yardley (2)
8. Cosgrove & Grafton (1)
9. Danvers & Wardoun (2)
10. Deanshanger (2)
11. Grange Park (2)
12. Hackleton (1)
13. Harpole & Grange (2)
14. Heyfords & Bugbrooke (2)
15. Kings Sutton (1)
16. Kingthorn (1)
17. Little Brook (1)
18. Middleton Cheney (2)
19. Old Stratford (1)
20. Salcey (1)
21. Silverstone (1)
22. Steane (1)
23. Tove (1)
24. Towcester Brook (3)
25. Towcester Mill (2)
26. Washington (1)
27. Whittlewood (1)

=== Wellingborough ===
Wards from 1 April 1974 (first election 7 June 1973) to 5 May 1983:

Wards from 5 May 1983 to 6 May 1999:

Wards from 6 May 1999 to 7 May 2015:

1. Brickhill (3)
2. Castle (3)
3. Croyland (3)
4. Earls Barton (3)
5. Finedon (2)
6. Great Doddington & Wilby (1)
7. Hemmingwell (3)
8. Irchester (3)
9. North (1)
10. Queensway (3)
11. Redwell East (2)
12. Redwell West (2)
13. South (1)
14. Swanspool (3)
15. West (1)
16. Wollaston (2)

Wards from 7 May 2015 to 1 April 2021:

1. Bozeat (1)
2. Brickhill (2)
3. Croyland (3)
4. Earls Barton (3)
5. Finedon (2)
6. Great Doddington & Wilby (1)
7. Harrowden & Sywell (2)
8. Hatton (2)
9. Irchester (3)
10. Isebrook (1)
11. Queensway (3)
12. Redwell (3)
13. Rixon (3)
14. Swanspool (2)
15. Victoria (3)
16. Wollaston (2)

== Electoral wards by constituency ==
Wards as they existed on 1 April 2021.

=== Corby and East Northamptonshire ===
North Northamptonshire: Corby Rural (polling districts CRWA, CSCA, CWGA, CWGB & CWGC); Corby West; Irthlingborough (polling districts RA, RB, RR, SG, SZ & UQ); Kingswood; Lloyds; Oakley; Oundle; Raunds; Thrapston.

=== Daventry ===
North Northamptonshire: Earls Barton.

West Northamptonshire: Braunston & Crick; Brixworth; Daventry East; Daventry West; Long Buckby; Moulton; Silverstone (polling districts SAG, SAP, SAQ, SBJ & SCL); Woodford & Weedon.

=== Kettering ===
North Northamptonshire: Burton & Broughton; Clover Hill; Corby Rural (polling districts CRWB, CRWC, CRWD, CRWE, CSCB & CSCC); Desborough; Ise; Northall; Rothwell & Mawsley; Wicksteed; Windmill.

=== Northampton North ===
West Northamptonshire: Abington & Phippsville; Boothville & Parklands; Castle; Dallington Spencer; Headlands; Kingsthorpe North; Kingsthorpe South; St. George; Talavera.

=== Northampton South ===
West Northamptonshire: Billing & Rectory Farm; Delapre & Rushmere; Duston East Duston West & St. Crispin; East Hunsbury & Shelfleys; Nene Valley; Riverside Park; Sixfields.

=== South Northamptonshire ===
North Northamptonshire: Irchester (polling districts WAA, WAB, WPA, WPB & WPC).

West Northamptonshire: Brackley; Bugbrooke; Deanshanger; Hackleton & Grange Park; Middleton Cheney; Silverstone (SAA, SAB, SAN, SAT, SBP, SBX, SCV, SDG, SDW, SDZ, SEF, SEW, SFE, SFF, SFN, SFO, SFR, SFW, SGD, SGF & SGK); Towcester & Roade.

=== Wellingborough and Rushden ===
North Northamptonshire: Brickhill & Queensway; Croyland & Swanspool; Finedon; Hatton Park; Higham Ferrers; Irchester (polling districts WIA & WIB); Irthlingborough (polling districts SD & SF); Rushden Pemberton West; Rushden South.

== See also ==
- List of parliamentary constituencies in Northamptonshire
