= Hawthorn Hill, Berkshire =

Hamlet in Berkshire, England

Coordinates: 51.459487°N 0.743119°W

Hawthorn Hill
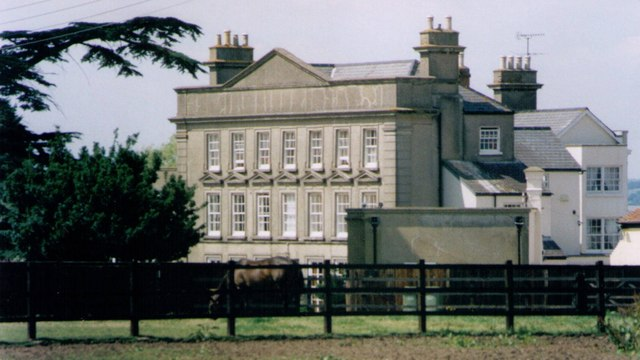
- Cruchfield Manor House

- Location within Berkshire
- OS grid reference: SU872742
- Unitary authority: Bracknell Forest
- Shire county: Berkshire
- Region: South East
- Country: England
- Sovereign state: United Kingdom
- Post town: BRACKNELL
- Postcode district: RG42
- Dialling code: 01344
- Police: Thames Valley
- Fire: Royal Berkshire
- Ambulance: South Central
- UK Parliament: Maidenhead

Hawthorn Hill is a hamlet in Berkshire, England, within the civil parish of Warfield. The settlement lies at the junction of the A3095 and A330 roads, and is approximately 3 miles (4.8 km) north of Bracknell. Hawthorn Hill Racecourse was situated where Bird Hills Golf Centre is today, at the end of the Drift Road. It was built on a farm owned by Sir Robert Wilmot. National Hunt meetings started in 1888 and stopped in 1913. They began again in 1921, and were quite a social event during the Jazz Age. They finally ended in 1939.
