= Hawkenbury, Maidstone =

Hamlet in Kent, England

Coordinates: 51.174880°N 0.599470°E

Hawkenbury
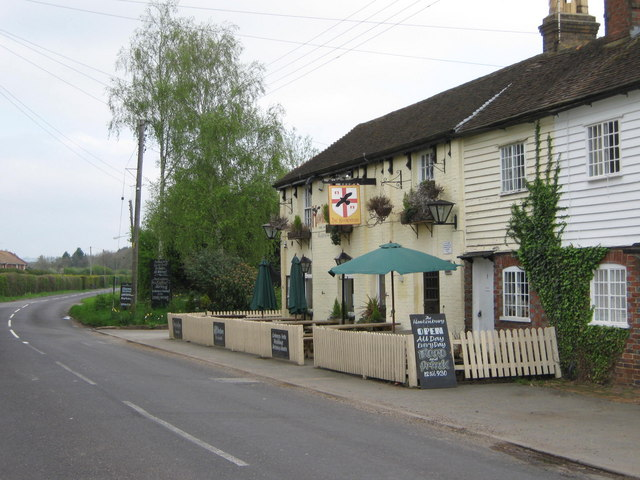
- The Hawkenbury pub

- Location within Kent
- District: Maidstone
- Shire county: Kent
- Region: South East
- Country: England
- Sovereign state: United Kingdom
- Post town: Tonbridge
- Postcode district: TN12
- Police: Kent
- Fire: Kent
- Ambulance: South East Coast
- UK Parliament: Weald of Kent

Hawkenbury is a hamlet in the Maidstone district of Kent, England, in the civil parish of Staplehurst.

Hawkenbury is approximately 2 miles (3 km) north-east of Staplehurst and 2 miles (3 km) north-west of Headcorn.

Amenities include a pub with rooms, campsite and garden centre.
