= Carl Johan Fahlcrantz =

Swedish painter (1774–1861)

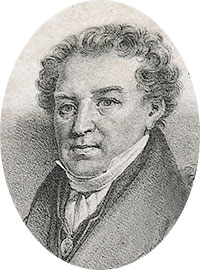
Carl Johan Fahlcrantz (c.1847)

Carl Johan Fahlcrantz (29 November 1774 – 29 November 1861) was a Swedish painter.

== Biography ==
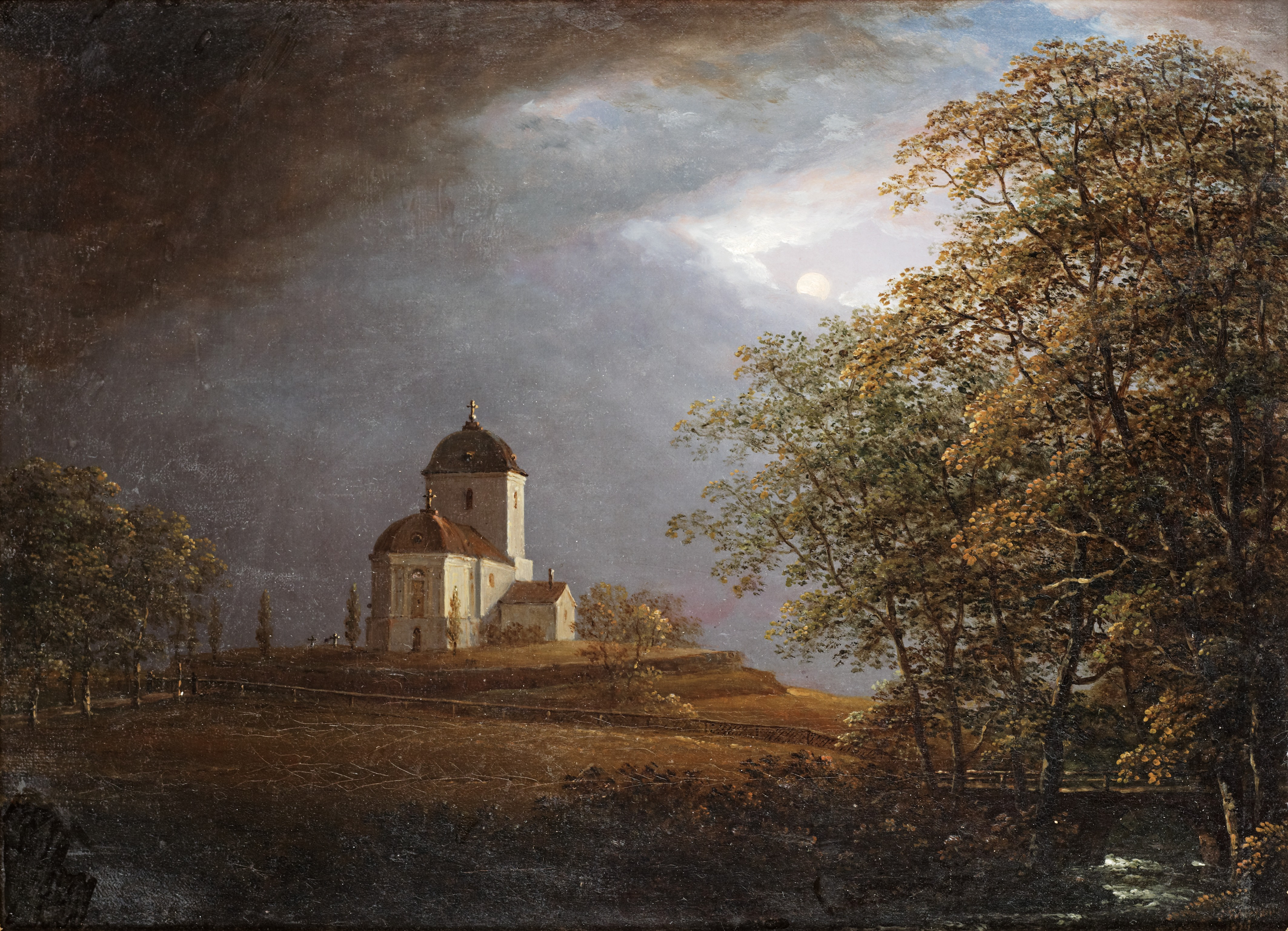
View of Andrarum Church

He was born in the Stora Tuna Parish of Dalarna, Sweden. He was the son of Johan Fahlcrantz and Gustafva De Brenner. His father was a vicar in Kungsåra parish. His brothers were the sculptor Axel Magnus Fahlcrantz (1780–1854) and the theologian Christian Eric Fahlcrantz (1780–1866). His great-grandfather Elias Brenner (1647–1717) was an artist and draftsman. His great-grandmother Sophia Elisabet Brenner (1659–1730) was a writer and poet.

In 1791, he went to Stockholm and secured an apprenticeship as a decorative painter with Johan Gottlob Brusell at the Royal Dramatic Theatre. After one year, he became a student of Emanuel Limnell and lived with his family until around 1800. He also received guidance from Elias Martin and studied landscape painting with Louis Belanger, who had immigrated from France in 1798. Soon, he began to receive numerous orders for landscapes and vedute, often composed with atmospheric lighting. He was especially influenced by Martin, who had made study trips to England. Despite his initial success, he had to make ends meet by taking students and selling some paintings at a discount.

In 1802, he was named a member candidate (agré) at the Royal Swedish Academy of Fine Arts and became a member the following year. In 1805, he and Gustaf Erik Hasselgren received stipends from the Academy for a period of four years. He intended to visit Italy but postponed the trip until 1807, when he asked for permission to spend his money within Sweden. This was agreed to on condition that he submit two landscapes to the Academy each year, to show his progress. He continued to receive the stipend as a travel subsidy for foreign trips to Norway (1827) and Denmark (1829). In 1815, he had become a Professor at the Academy. He was also an honorary member of several academies in Europe and the United States. In addition to orders from the Swedish Royal Family, he received several commissions from Tsar Nicholas I.

He remained single until 1849, when he married Anna Sophie Hagström, a shopkeeper's daughter who was thirty years his junior. He died during 1861 and was buried at St. John's Church, Stockholm.

His works may be seen at the Nationalmuseum, Uppsala University Library, Göteborgs konstmuseum and the Nordiska museet.

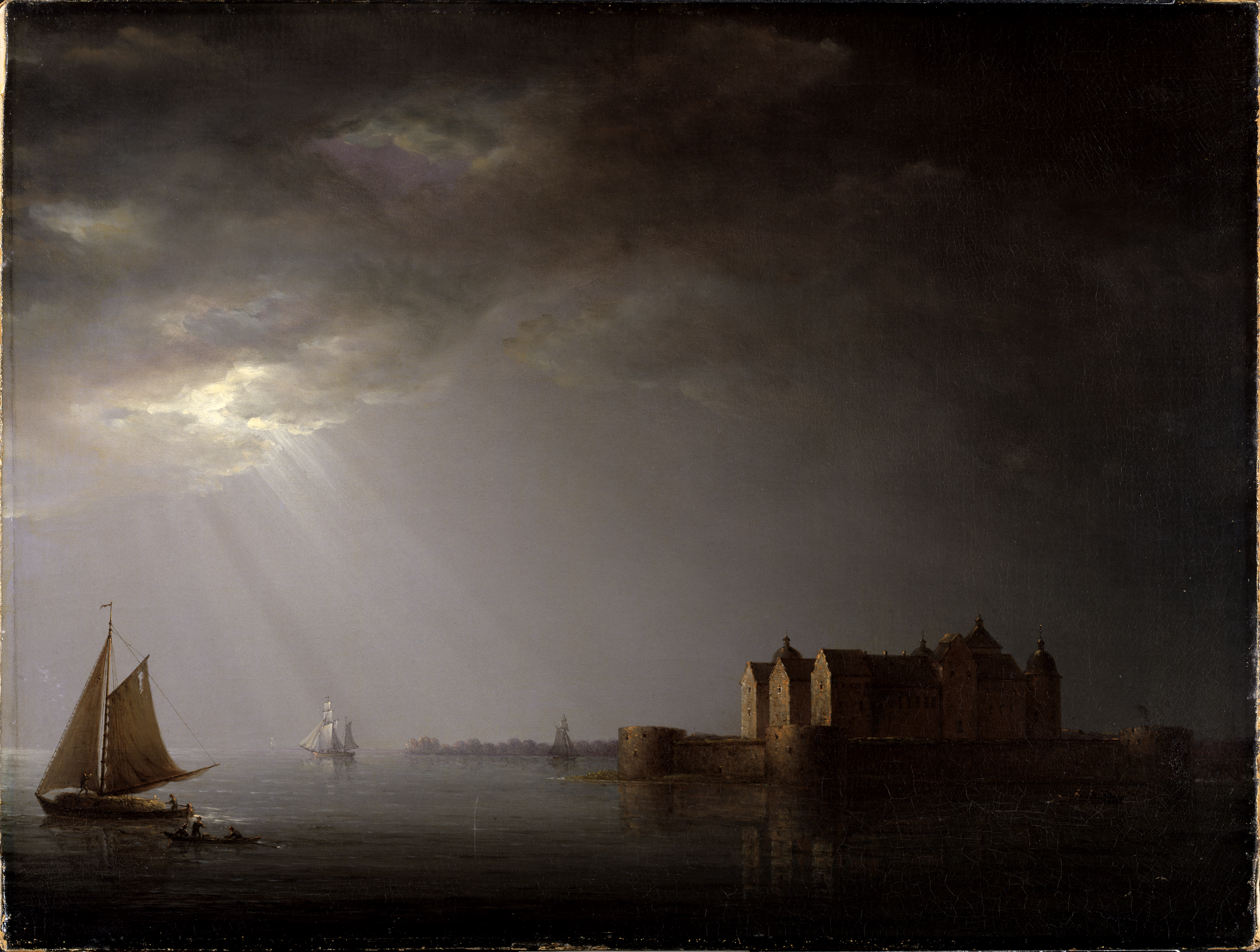
Kalmar Castle by Moonlight
