= Louis Belanger =

Louis Belanger may refer to:

- Louis Bélanger (born 1964), Canadian film director and screenwriter
- Louis Belanger (painter) (1756–1816), French-born Swedish landscape artist
