= Limnell =

Limnell is a surname, likely of Swedish origin. Notable people with the surname include:

- Emanuel Limnell (1766-1861), Swedish decorative painter and watercolorist
- Fredrika Limnell (1816-1897), Swedish philanthropist, mecenate, feminist, and salonist
