= Hafod estate =

Estate in Ceredigion, Wales

Coordinates: 52.34368°N 3.8223°W

Hafod Estate: Welsh: Hafod Uchtryd
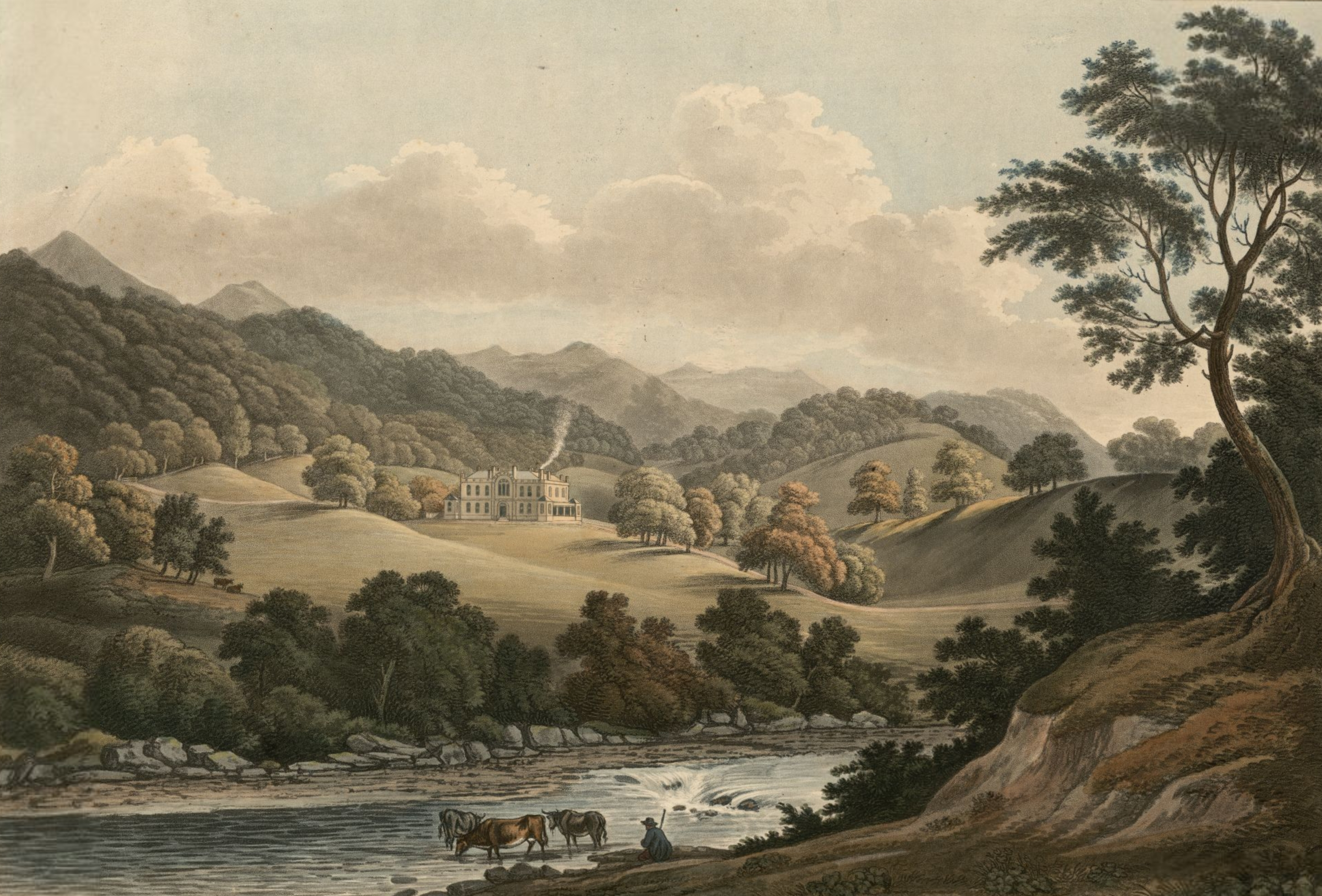
- A depiction of the Hafod Estate, circa 1795 by John Warwick Smith

- Location within Ceredigion
- OS grid reference: SN6676
  - Cardiff: 90 mi (140 km)SE
- Principal area: Ceredigion
- Preserved county: Dyfed
- Country: Wales
- Sovereign state: United Kingdom
- Post town: ABERYSTWYTH
- Postcode district: SY23
- Dialling code: 01970
- Police: Dyfed-Powys
- Fire: Mid and West Wales
- Ambulance: Welsh
- UK Parliament: Ceredigion Preseli
- Senedd Cymru – Welsh Parliament: Ceredigion

The Hafod estate, also known as Hafod Uchtryd (Welsh for 'Uchtryd summer mansion'), is a wooded and landscaped estate in the Ystwyth valley in Ceredigion, Wales. Near Devil's Bridge, Cwmystwyth and Pont-rhyd-y-groes, it is off the B4574 road. Hafod estate land was within the boundaries of the Cistercian Abbey Strata Florida (Welsh: Caron-Uwch-Clawdd). Originally a hunting lodge for Welsh Chieftains, it became home to the landed gentry and the nobility. In the late eighteenth century, a celebrated landscape was created under the ownership of Thomas Johnes.

The estate is in the parish of Llanfihangel y Creuddyn near Llanddewi-Brefi. Llanfihangel-y-Creuddyn was a chapel-of-ease in the parish. It was rebuilt for Thomas Johnes by James Wyatt in 1801. The estate shares a border along the Ystwyth with that of the Trawsgoed estate.

== Early history ==
After the dissolution of the monasteries by king Henry VIII (1536–1540) during the English Reformation the abbey's holdings were divided and awarded to new tenants. Some of the Strata Florida lands were granted to the Herbert family, who came to Ceredigion during the reign of Elizabeth I. Sir Richard Herbert of Pengelly and Cwmystwyth was High Sheriff of Cardigan from 22 November 1542.

A rent roll dated 1540 for the granges of Mevenith, Cwmystwyth and Hafodwen (‘newe leases’) reveals that W[illia]m Herbert and Morgan Herbert were tenants of several properties formerly belonging to the Abbey of Strata Florida, including significantly: Havodychdryd Doleygors Pantycrave Bwlch Gwalter parcell of Ty Loge [...] 4 parte of Pwll Piran parte of Pregnant(sic) Prignant Isaf and Blaenmerin and Alltgron. Havodychdryd or Hafod Uchtryd is the name of the house and demesne and the other properties.

The estate became famous in the late 18th century when its owner, Thomas Johnes (1748–1816), developed it as a showpiece of the Picturesque idea of landscape; the estate and the Gothic house were the subject of many descriptions and images produced by contemporary visitors. The history of the estate is the subject of several books, most notably Peacocks in Paradise by Elisabeth Inglis-Jones, and the Hafod Landscape by Jennifer Macve.

== Johnes' Mansion ==
A new mansion at Hafod was built in 1785 by Johnes, after the demolition of the Herbert structure, from the designs of Thomas Baldwin of Bath in the Gothic style. The library was a spacious, octagonal building within the mansion. Johnes collected many rare and noble books on natural history and manuscripts in Welsh, French and Latin, which also included many by Edward Lhuyd and many manuscripts and printed editions of the French chronicles of the later Middle Ages. The library collection of the Marquis de Pesaro was purchased and housed at the estate. A sculpture by Thomas Banks, representing Thetis dipping Achilles in the river Styx stood in the library; The sculpture was commissioned by his cousin-wife Jane Johnes; the head of Achilles is that of their baby daughter, Mariamne Johnes (who lived 1784–1811). This work is currently on display at the Victoria and Albert Museum. Adjoining the library was the conservatory 160 feet (49 m) in length that was filled with a wide variety of rare plants.

Near the entrance from this room into the dining-room hung a painting by Peter Paul Rubens of Decius Mus receiving the Benediction of the Pontifex Maximus. Over the mantel-piece hung a painting of The prophet Elijah fed by the ravens, originally housed at the abbey of Talley, Carmarthenshire, and was, on the dissolution of that establishment, given by the superior to an ancestor of Johnes. Among numerous pictures on display within the mansion were, a portrait of Mr Johnes of Llanvair, by Sir Godfrey Kneller; of Robert Liston, by Wickstead; of Richard Gorges, of Eye, Herefordshire; and of Viganoni; a copy of Guido's Cupid Sleeping, landscapes by Both and Berghem, a painting of the ruined Alchymist by Salvator Rosa. In the drawing-room were, Hogarth's celebrated picture of Southwark Fair, a Descent from the Cross by Van Dyck, an Ecce Homo by Moralez, two landscapes by Claude, a Procession of the Doge of Venice by Canaletti; an Assumption by Bernardo Lonino, pupil of Leonardo da Vinci, which was originally an altar-piece at Lugano; a Holy Family by Rubens, a portrait of Lord Chancellor Thurlow by Gardener, and some beautiful miniatures by Mariamne Johnes. The hall was constructed of Mona marble embellished with a Grecian statue of Dionysus; in addition, six paintings of subjects from Froissart, in imitation of basso relievo, by Stothard.

On 13 March 1807, a fire broke out that completely destroyed the mansion including the contents of the library. Johnes was in London attending Parliament when he heard the news and that his wife and daughter had escaped. The family moved to a rented house in Castle Hill near Aberystwyth. Baldwin of Bath was again hired as architect. On 1 September of the same year, on Johnes's birthday, construction to rebuild the mansion began. Contractors had agreed to pay a heavy financial penalty if the mansion house was not roofed-in by Christmas. Expectant upon moving in Johnes set about replacing the contents of the home. Many of the furnishings were purchased from the Palladian mansion known as Fonthill Splendens, owned by William Thomas Beckford. Interior French glass doors and a number of chimney mantle pieces were purchased, one of which had been sculpted by Banks that featured two couples: Pan and Iris, Penelope and Odysseus. These items were stored at Hafod until the mansion was complete. During construction the family left Castle Hill making tours of London and Scotland, each year returning to find the house unfinished. Construction delays continued until Johnes remained in Wales and made weekly visits, personally overseeing the progress. Altogether the project took three years to complete.

== Golden years ==
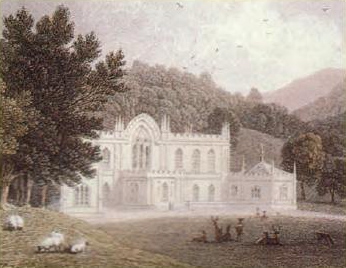
Hafod Uchtryd circa 1795

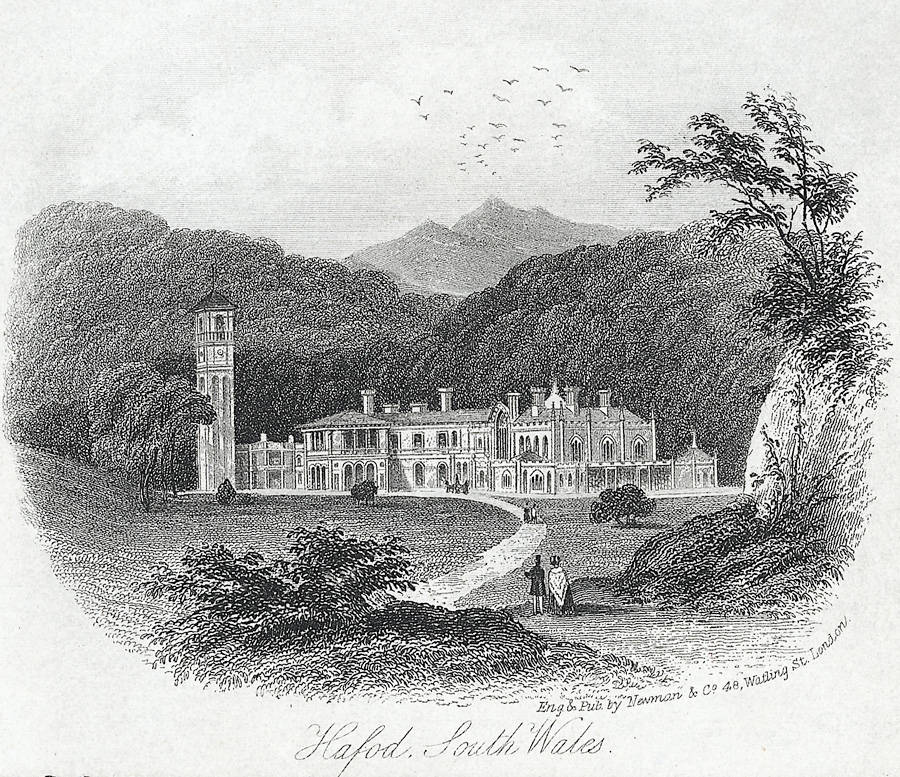
Hafod with later additions to the house

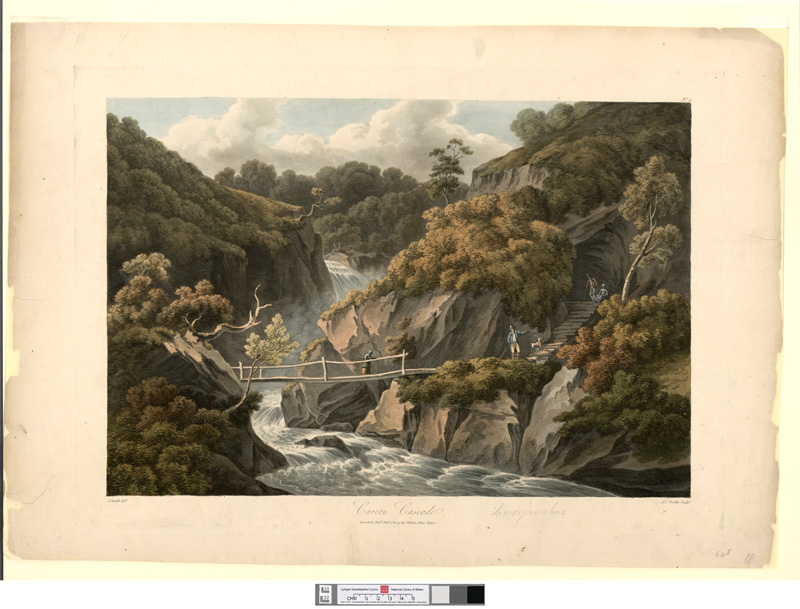
Cavern Cascade, by John 'Warwick' Smith c.1810

Between 1790 and 1810 were the golden years at Hafod. Between 1782 and 1813 approximately 405 to 485 hectares (1000–1200 acres) of forest, mainly European Larch and Scots Pine were planted on high ground by the estate owner Colonel Thomas Johnes, with oak and beech on the lower, more fertile land. In spite of two months of little rain, of 80,000 larch planted in April 1796, only 200 died. Following a visit to the estate in 1798 by Charles Howard, 11th Duke of Norfolk, the President of the Royal Society of Arts (RSA), Johnes was encouraged to offer himself for the awards made by the Society for silviculture. He was awarded five Gold Medals as follows:

- 1800 - The Gold Medal, being the Premium offered for planting Larch – Trees was this Session adjudged to Thomas Johnes, MP of Hafod.
- 1801 – The Gold Medal, being the Premium offered for sowing, planting, and inclosing Timber-trees, was this Session adjudged to Thomas Johnes, MP of Hafod.
- 1802 - The Gold Medal, being the Premium offered for sowing, planting, and enclosing Timber-trees was this session adjudged to Thomas Johnes, MP of Hafod
- 1805 – The Gold Medal of the Society was this Session adjudged to Thomas Johnes, MP of Hafod, in Cardiganshire, for his plantations of Oaks.
- 1810 - The Gold Medal of the Society was this Session adjudged to Thomas Johnes, MP of Hafod in Cardiganshire, for his Plantations of Larch and other trees.

Approximately three million trees were planted on the estate during the tenancy of Colonel Johnes.

== Eglwys Newydd church ==
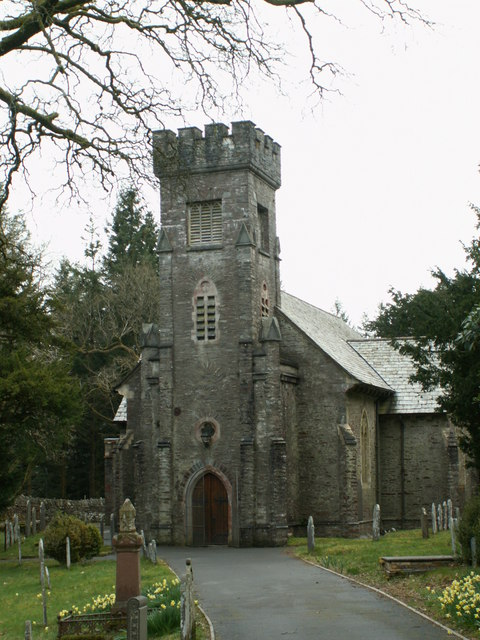
The Saint Michael's Hafod, Eglwys Newydd church

In 1803 Johnes hired James Wyatt, architect of Broadway Tower and Fonthill Abbey, to design a church for the estate to replace the existing structure established in 1620 by William Herbert of the Herbert family, which had fallen into disuse and was surrounded by bramble.

The cruciform structure, constructed at the sole expense of Johnes, was designed in Gothic architecture, has a square tower at the west end. In the centre of the cross is a richly ornamented font of artificial stone, supported on an octagonal shaft; one side of the basin bears a shield charged with the arms of the family of Johnes, and the faces of the shaft are embellished with figures representing the cardinal virtues. A painting, by Fuseli, of Christ and the two disciples of Emmaus is installed in the northern transept. The southern window was composed of an ancient stained and painted Renaissance Flemish glass had been installed in Cardigan Priory church. Johnes removed the window from that church for his own project at Hafod. The window shattered by fire in 1932, and the fragments collected together in small groups.

Several of the Herberts of Hafod are buried in the church graveyard, to whom headstones were erected.

In the fire in 1932, a sculpture monument by Francis Legatt Chantrey, erected to the memory of the late Miss Johnes, which depicted herself and her weeping parents was destroyed after well-meaning fire fighters doused it with water causing it to shatter.

Known today as Hafod Church, it lies within the Vicarage of Llanafan, Aberystwyth. Services are still held at the church every other week in English and Welsh.

== Farm and dairy ==
New Farm (Welsh: Gelmast), an experimental farm including an extensive dairy was established at Hafod. It was thought that the lands of Hafod and surrounding Cardiganshire were of a type of soil that could not support dairy farming, however in 1800 approximately four tons of cheese and 1,200 pounds (540 kg) of butter were produced. Johnes experimented with varieties of cattle to determine which would produce the most milk. To accomplish these studies, he imported 40 cows from the Netherlands which Johnes referred to as his "Dutch ladies". He was subsequently able to produce Parmesan, Stilton, Cheshire and Gloucestershire cheese at will from his own dairy.

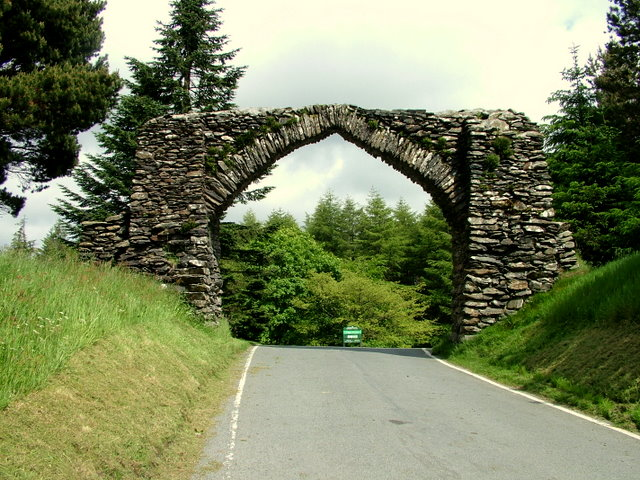
The Arch built in 1810

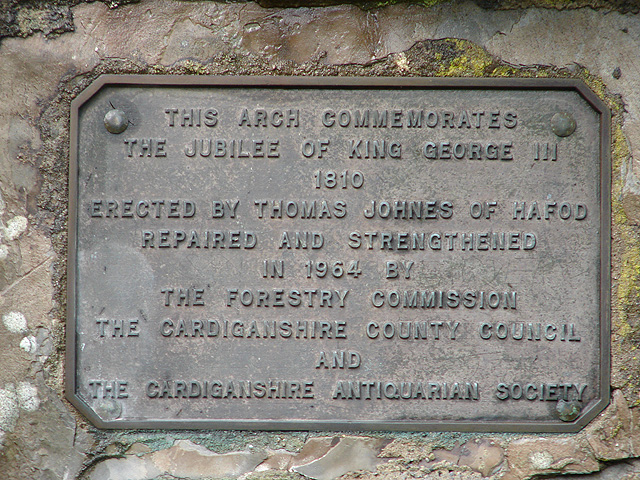
The plaque on the Arch

In addition to his concern for the social welfare of those at Hafod, Johnes involved himself in the building of roads and bridges. Upon inheriting the estate there were no passable roads within its boundaries. He built Hafod Arch in 1810 to commemorate George III's golden jubilee. He also built a school for the poor of the community to attend at no charge. A fund was established to assist families hit by casualties. A physician was brought on staff and medicine was supplied. Each year he and Mrs. Johnes opened up their home at Christmas hosting a large event for everyone at Hafod including staff and tenants.

== Later ownership ==
- On 13 March 1833 the estate, surrounding structures and land were purchased by the Duke of Newcastle.
- In 1846 the property was sold to Sir Henry de Hoghton, 9th Baronet, Hoghton Tower, Lancashire.
- On 1 June 1857 William Chambers, Esq. acquired Hafod. A £63,000 (and interest) mortgage was secured from Rt. Hon. Baroness Margaret Willoughby de Broke
- 27 April 1871 Lady Willoughby sold the estate to John Waddingham (died 1890).
- From 1890 to 1940 Thomas James Waddingham owned the estate. He adopted Wales and Hafod as his home. He learned Welsh, sat as a JP and was involved in local affairs for the rest of his life. He leased the Myherin Forest area of the Estate to the Forestry Commission in 1929. After he ran out of money, he lived in Aberystwyth from 1932 to his death in 1938, aged 98.
- Between 1940 and 1946 Hafod changed hands three times, and was owned in turn by W. G. Tarrant, T. E. Davies and J. J. Rennie.

== Demolition ==
The mansion was declared vacant in 1946. By 1958 the house was derelict, and it was demolished that year. Only the stables remain, as the current estate offices, and a large pile of rubble. Other isolated buildings and cottages also survive, at least one of which may be rented as holiday accommodation.

== Today ==
Today the Hafod estate occupies some 200 hectares of the Ystwyth valley and surrounding hills. Most is owned by Natural Resources Wales which, in partnership with the Hafod Trust, is managing conservation and restoration projects with public and private funding. In 1998, the Hafod Estate received a grant of £330,000 from the Heritage Lottery Fund. The estate is designated Grade I on the Cadw/ICOMOS Register of Parks and Gardens of Special Historic Interest in Wales.

The Estate employs one full-time and two part-time management and administrative staff, a horse logger, and various contract workers and crafts-people.

Visitors to the Estate can enjoy scenic views and waymarked walks. The grassy parkland areas around the ruins of the old house contain diverse populations of grassland fungi, notably waxcaps, and is one of the best areas in the UK for these fungi.

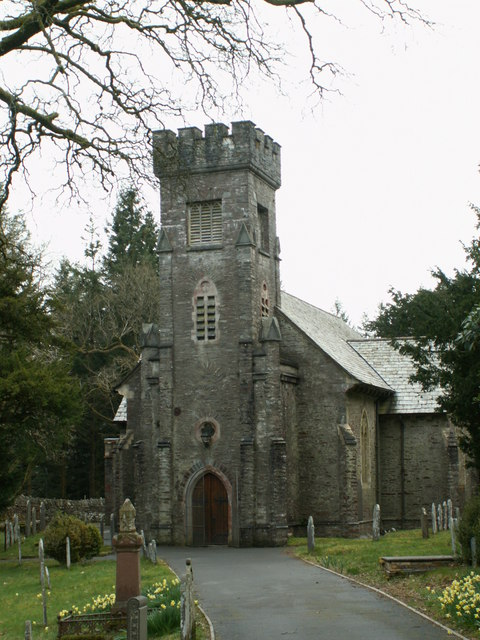
The church is the focal point at Hafod

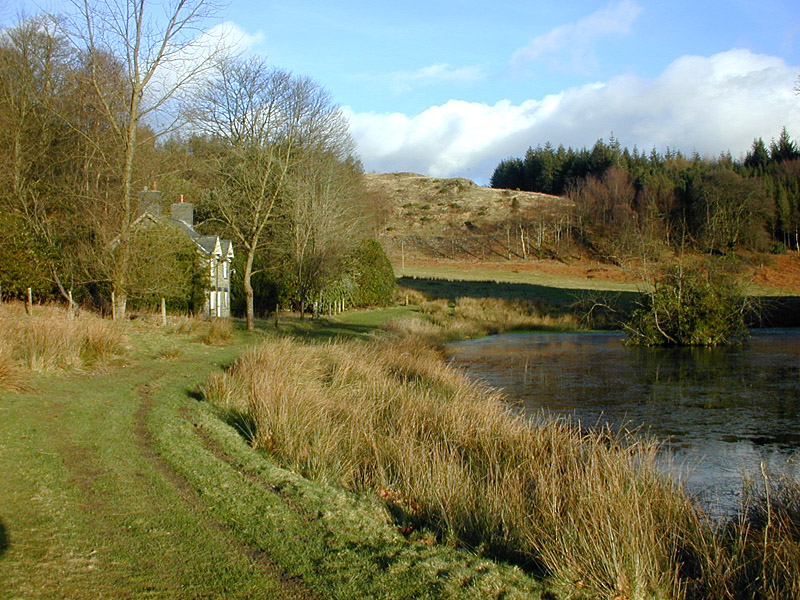
Hawthorn Cottage and pond

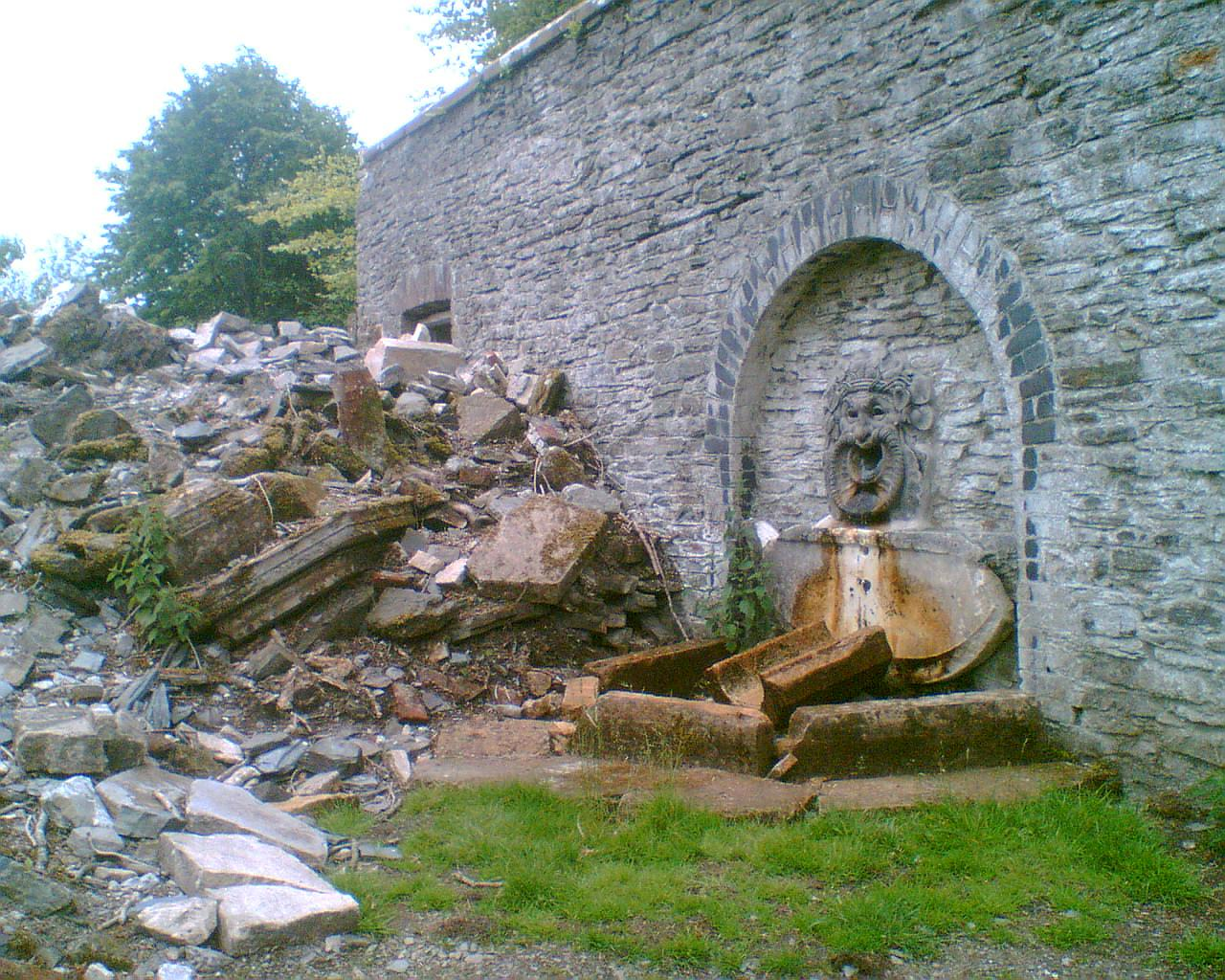
Rubble of the house ruins and remaining wall, with fountain

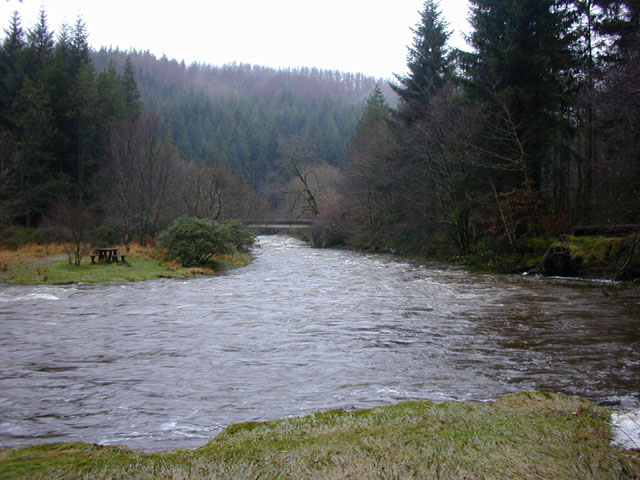
River Ystwyth in spate at Hafod

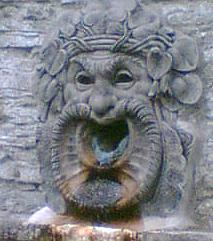
Fountain mask

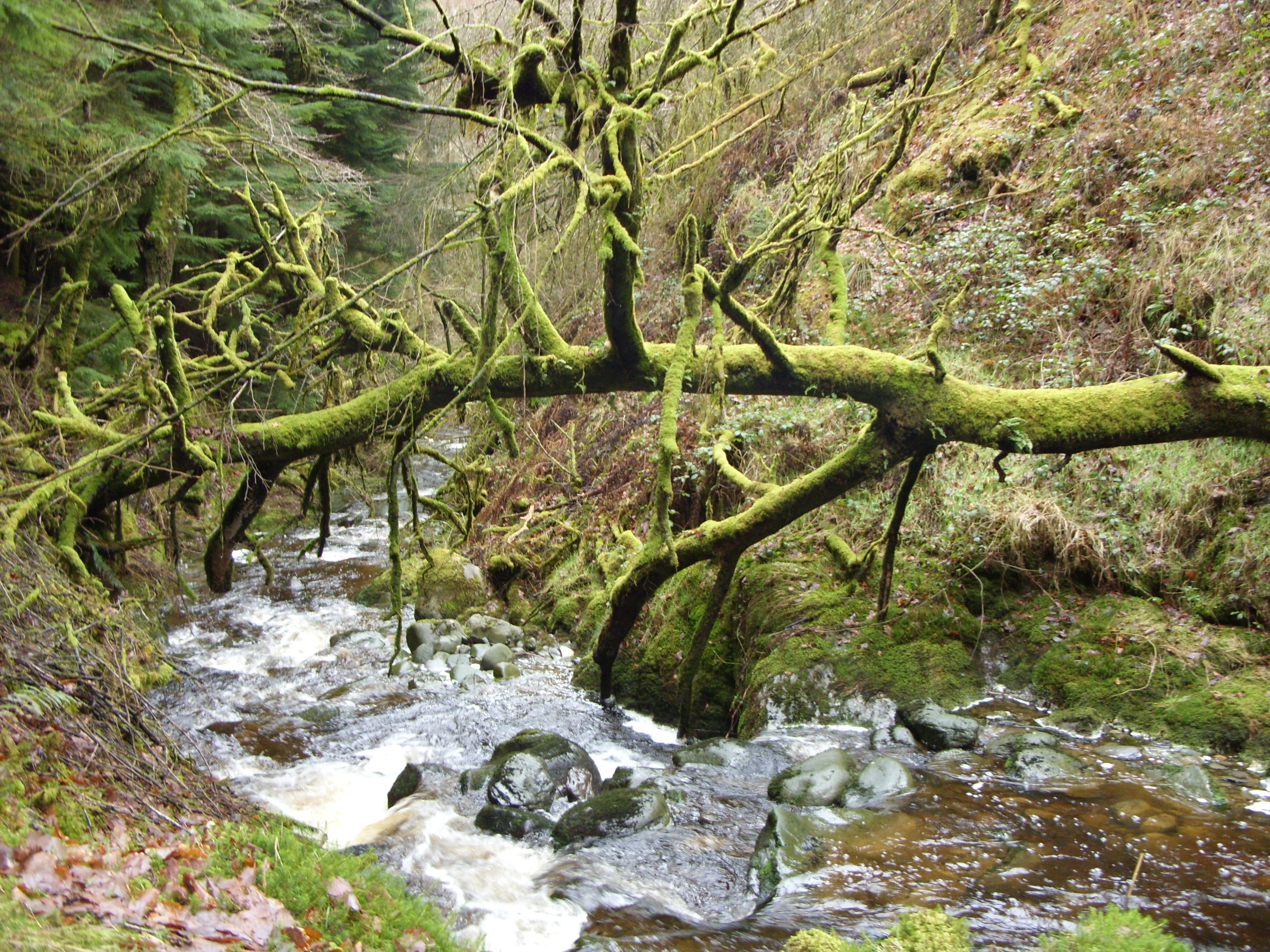
Cascade Walk

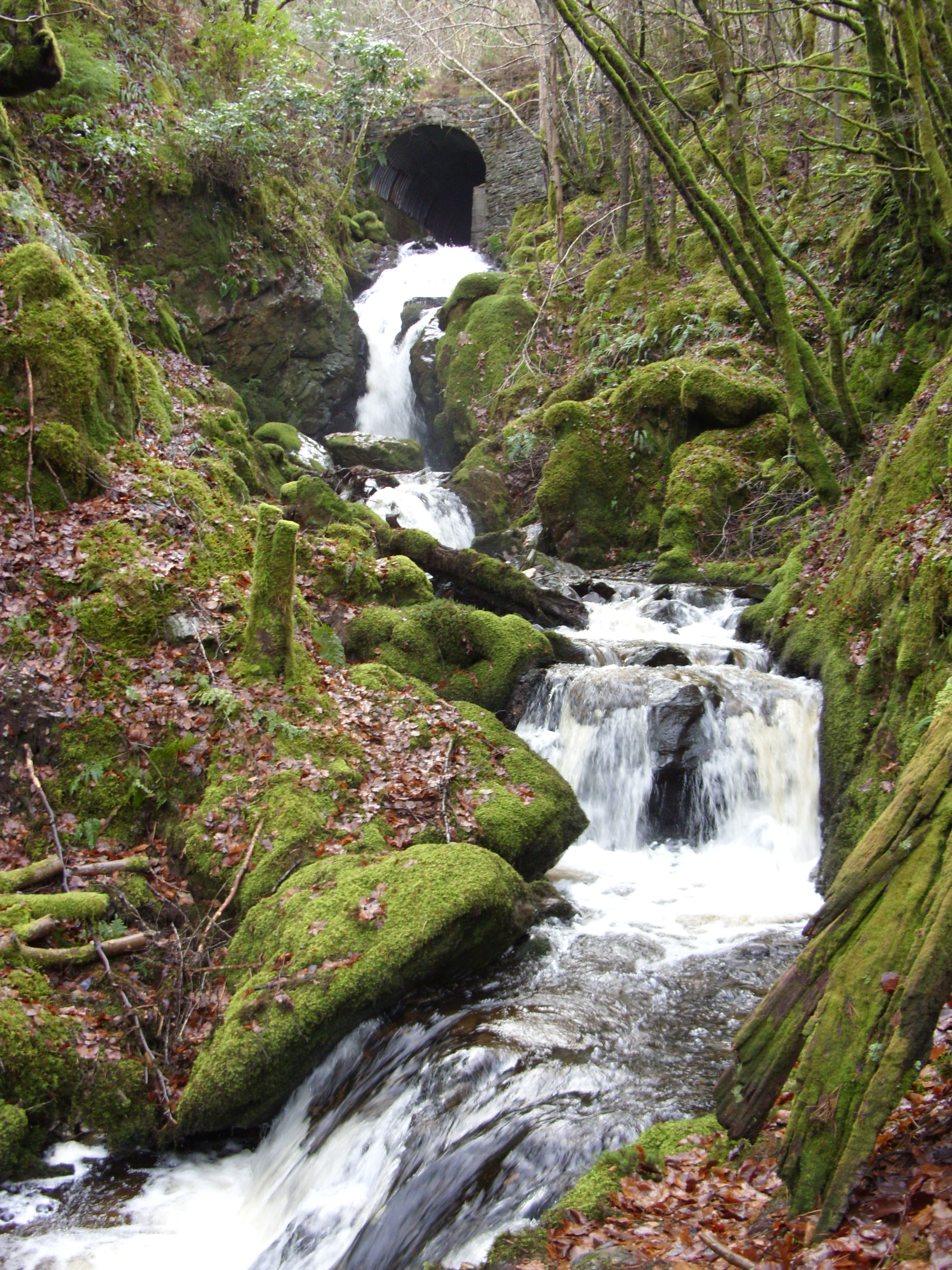
Waterfall, gentlemans walk

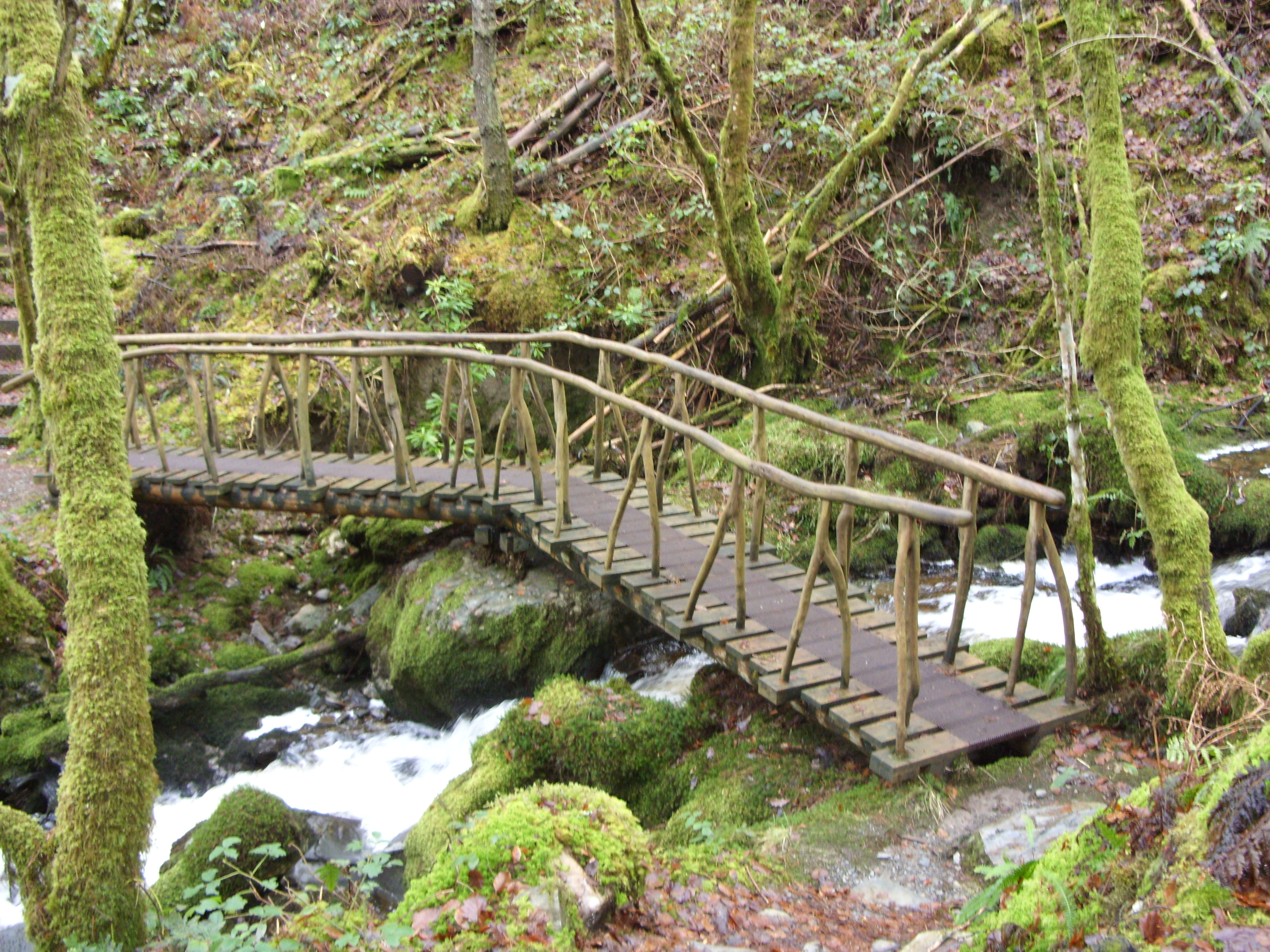
Wish bone bridge, gentlemans walk

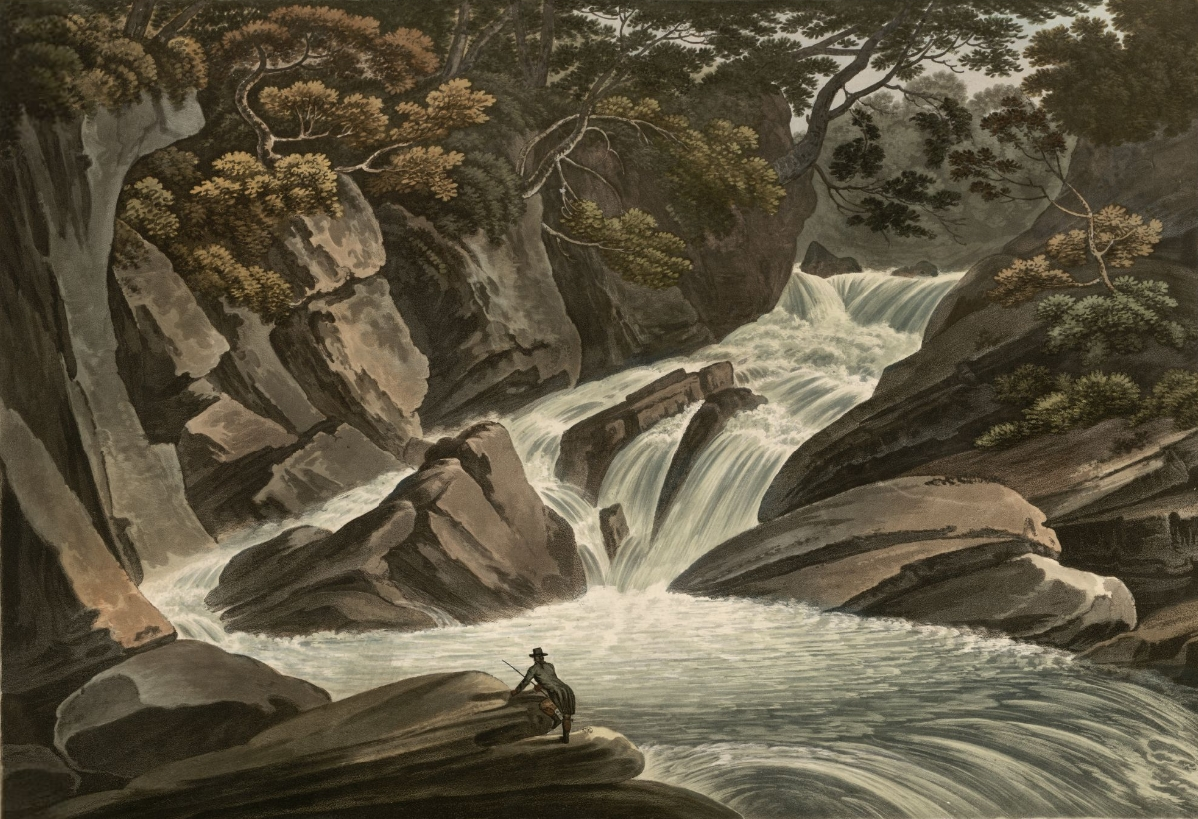
Upper part of the Peiryan cascade

== See also ==
- List of gardens in Wales
