= B4574 road =

Road in Wales

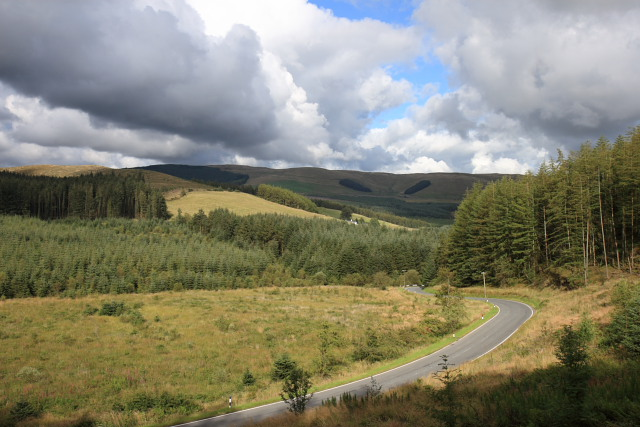
The B4574 heading to Cwmystwyth

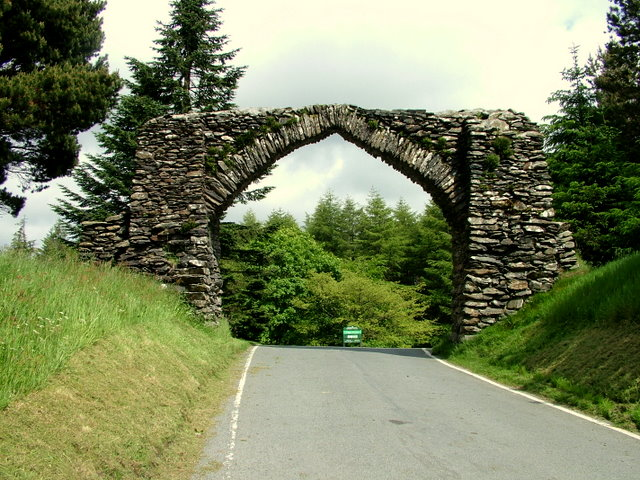
The arch at Hafod Uchtryd in 2005

The B4574 is a road linking the villages of Pont-rhyd-y-groes in Ceredigion, Wales, and Devil's Bridge, 12 miles (19 km) east of Aberystwyth, and noted for three bridges built one above each other as well as for its falls and narrow gauge steam railway. The route is six miles (9.7 km) long, and has been described by the AA as one of the ten most scenic drives in the world

The road runs partly along a section of the upper Ystwyth valley, passing the remains of the Cwmystwyth Mines, a monumental arch built to commemorate George III's golden jubilee, and the Hafod Estate.
