= Louis Belanger (painter) =

Swedish painter (1756–1816)

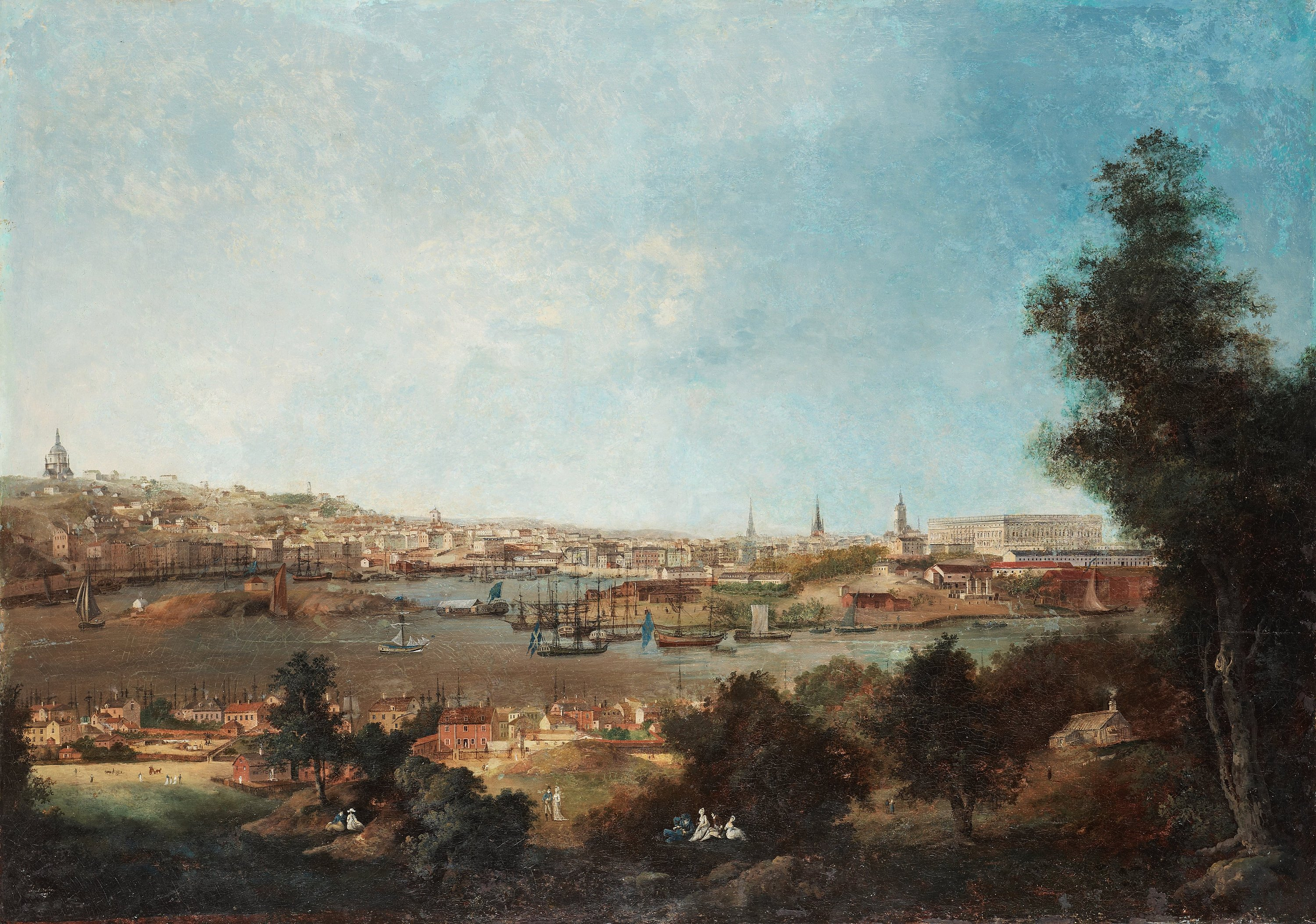
Stockholm seen from Djurgården

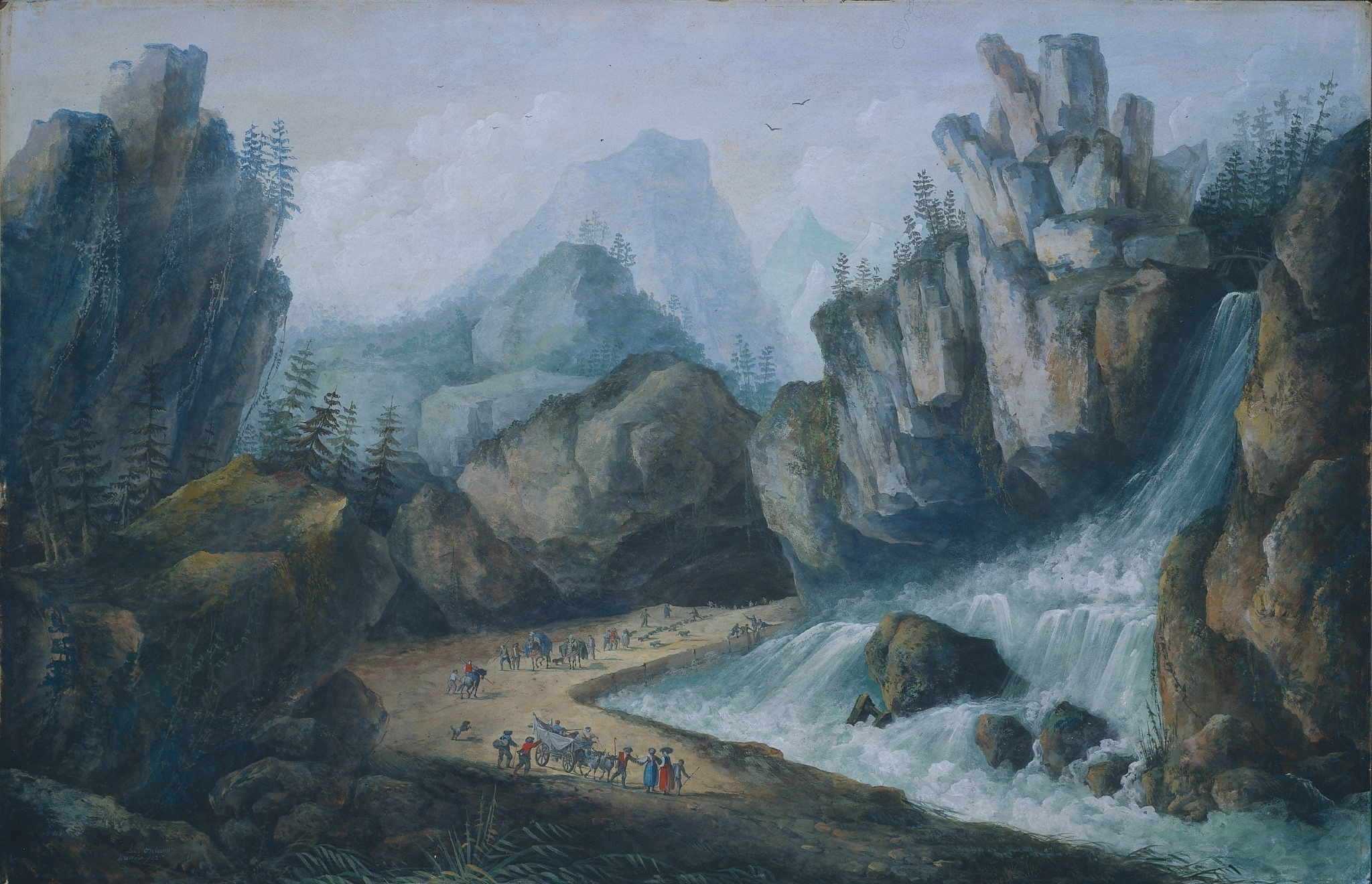
Torrent and Waterfall in the Alps

Louis Belanger (25 August 1756, Paris – 16 March 1816, Stockholm) was a French-born Swedish landscape artist.

== Biography ==
He was a student of Francesco Casanova and Louis-Gabriel Moreau. After working as a landscape painter in several countries; including Italy, where he probably lived in Rome from 1780 to 1785, he returned to France, but was there for only a short time before the outbreak of the Revolution. At some point in 1790, he moved to London, where he exhibited at the Royal Academy and created works intended for making into prints.

Hearing about the opportunities available for painters in Russia, he attempted to emigrate there via Finland, but was stymied by Russia's involvement in the war against France. He finally settled in Stockholm in 1798, where he quickly established himself; becoming a member of the Royal Swedish Academy of Fine Arts and winning an appointment as a court painter. He painted in oils and gouache, with motifs from all the places he had visited, and was especially known for his dramatic scenes with rocks and waterfalls.

For many years, he was planning a large album to be called Voyage pittoresque de la Suède, that would present all of his best landscapes in aquatint, working in conjunction with a now little-known artist named Louis J. A. Cordier de Bonneville (1766-1843). Ultimately, only nineteen were engraved and included in a book with seven works by Johan Adam von Gerdten. Later, some of his works would be engraved by James Merigot. He also created works depicting Swedish folk costumes. Among his many students, Carl Johan Fahlcrantz is especially notable.

His works may be seen at the Göteborgs konstmuseum, Nationalmuseum Norrköpings Konstmuseum and the Lunds universitets historiska museum.
