= Mariamne Johnes =

Botanist

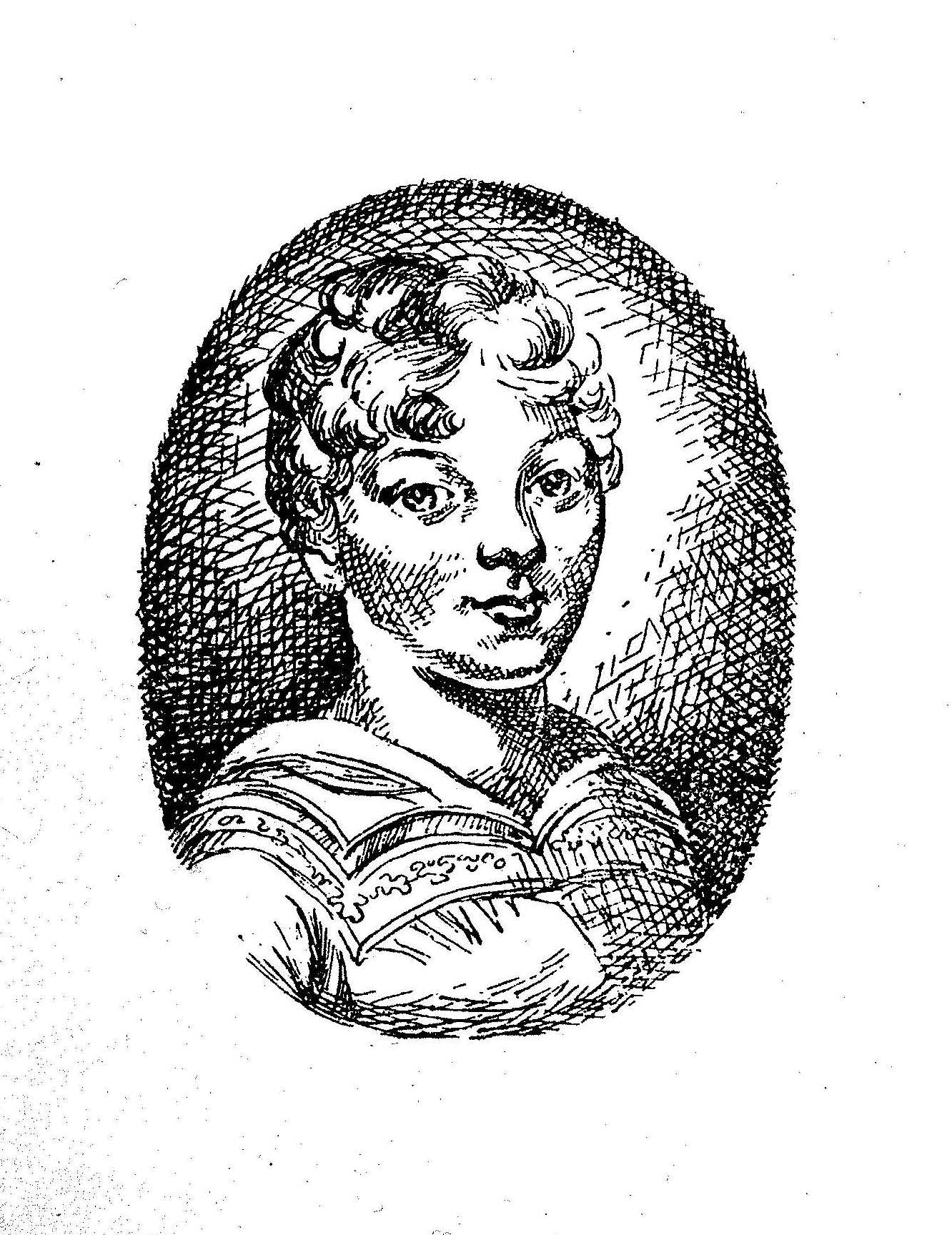
Mariamné Johnes

Mariamne Johnes (30 June 1784 – 4 July 1811) was the only daughter of Thomas Johnes of Hafod Uchtryd in mid Wales. She was a talented botanist and a friend and regular correspondent of the English botanist Sir James Edward Smith. She suffered with health problems for much of her life and died in London aged 27.

== Family ==
The first child of her parents, who were cousins, her mother being Jane Johnes, daughter of John Johnes of Dolaucothi, Carmarthenshire. Mariamné was born 30 June 1784. Her father was completely besotted with her and was closely involved with her upbringing. No expense was spared in her education; tutors from all over the world were hired. He shared an especially close emotional bond with Mariamné and was heartbroken when she predeceased him on 4 July 1811.

== Legacy ==
Much of the well-documented romantic landscape at Hafod Uchtryd, including Mariamne's Garden, was built by Thomas Johnes in order better his daughter's health and quality of life. In recent years the Gardens and landscape at Hafod have been restored and are open to the public.

After Mariamne's death her parents commissioned Francis Chantrey to produce a marble monument which depicts Thomas Johnes and his wife Jane mourning the loss of their daughter. The monument was badly damaged during a fire at Hafod church in 1932, but the remains can still be seen in the Church.
