= Thomas Johnes =

British politician (1748–1816)

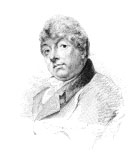
- Johnes by W. Worthington after Stothard
- Born: 1 September 1748; Ludlow, Shropshire, England
- Died: 23 April 1816 (aged 67); Langstone Cliff cottage, Devon
- Resting place: Eglwys Newydd (Saint Michael's Hafod Chapel); 52.369939°N 3.961772°W
- Education: Shrewsbury School, Eton College, Jesus College, Oxford and University of Edinburgh
- Alma mater: Jesus College, Oxford
- Occupations: M.P., landlord, printer, writer, landscape architect, farmer
- Known for: Agricultural endeavours at Hafod Estate
- Title: Esquire, Colonel, Lord Lieutenant, Knight of the Shire
- Spouse(s): Maria Burgh of Monmouthshire; Jane Johnes of Dolaucothy
- Children: Mariamne Johnes, (b. 30 June 1784, d. 4 July 1811), Evan Johnes, (b. 1786, died in infancy)
- Parent(s): Thomas Johnes of Llanvairchydogus and Elizabeth Knight, Croft Castle
- Relatives: Richard Knight of Downton, Marchweithian, Lord of Isaled, William Wilberforce

Thomas Johnes FRS (1 September 1748 – 23 April 1816) was a Member of Parliament, landscape architect, farmer, printer, writer and social benefactor. He is best known for his development of the Hafod Estate in Wales.

Johnes was born in Ludlow, Shropshire, England. Upon moving from his family home at Croft Castle to an isolated area near Cwmystwyth, in Ceredigion, Wales, Johnes began his life works by building a church for the local tenants, a school, and magnificent gardens, walks and bridges.

He undertook experiments in sheep and cattle breeding together with the growing of new crops and a thriving dairy was established. Trees were planted in great quantities on land considered unsuitable for crops; Johnes obtained the Royal Society of Arts medal five times for planting trees. He encouraged his tenants to improve their farming practices when in 1800 he published A Cardiganshire Landlord's Advice to his Tenants, with a Welsh translation and offered prizes for good crops. He was also one of the chief supporters of the Cardiganshire Agricultural Society, founded in 1784. Johnes devoted his entire life fortune to improving Hafod Estate.

== Family background and early life ==
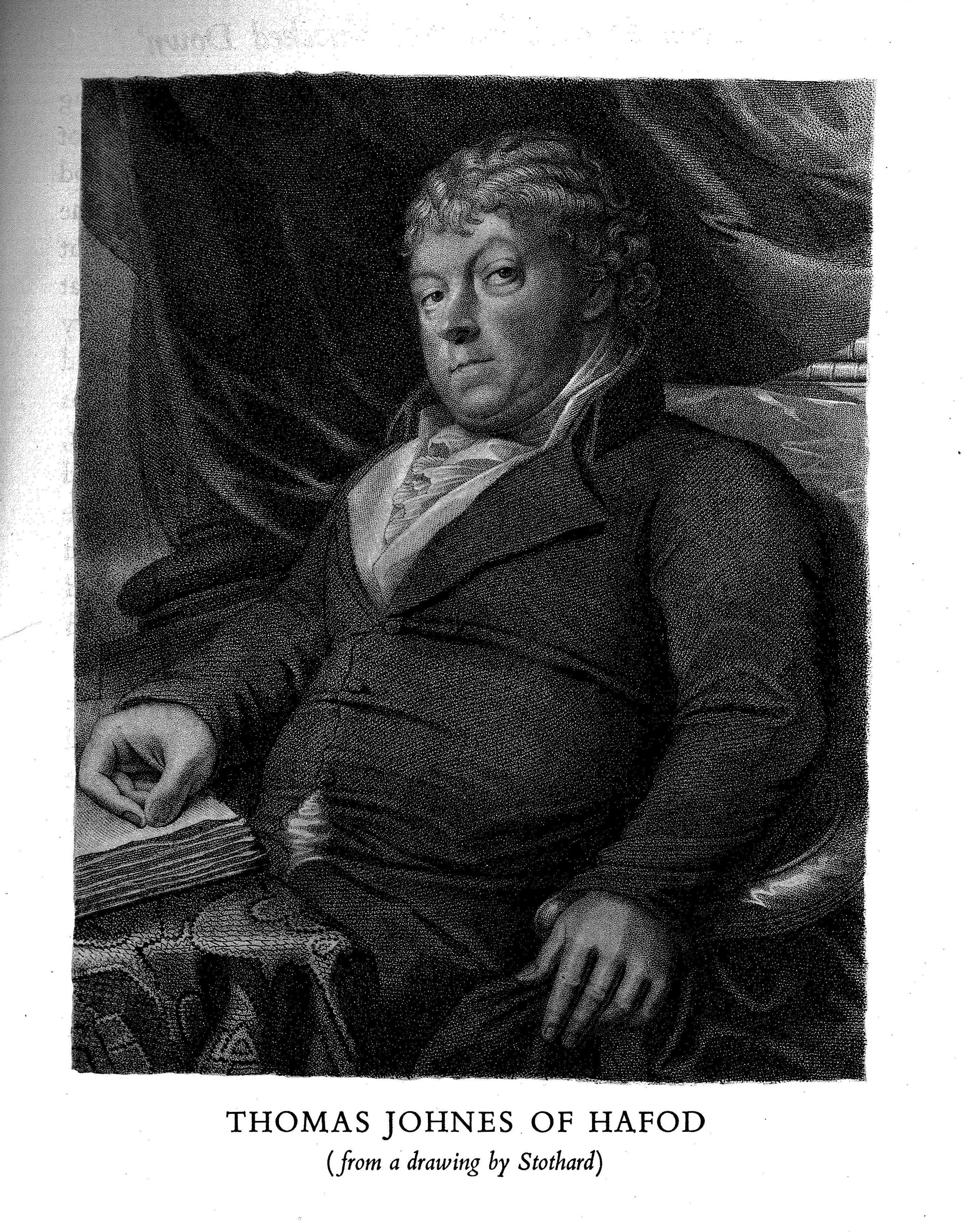
Portrait by Stothard

Johnes belonged to an old Welsh Carmarthenshire and Cardiganshire family. He was related to William Wilberforce through his mother's aunt Anne Knight. This side of his family can trace to Marchweithian, Lord of Isaled and Aed Mawr, a prince among the first colony of the Britons.

Johnes was the eldest son of Thomas Johnes (c. 1721–1780) of Llanfair Clydogau and his mother was Elizabeth Knight, daughter of Richard Knight of Croft Castle, Herefordshire. He was born on 1 September 1748 and baptised at Saint Laurence's Church in Ludlow. He was taught to read English at a local preparatory seminary in his native town, and then attended Shrewsbury School at the age of seven and remained for four years. In 1760, he was enrolled in Eton where he remained for seven years; during this time he studied the Latin classics and the Greek language under the direction of William Windham. In 1767, he attended a course of lectures on Logic and Moral Philosophy at the University of Edinburgh. Johnes left Edinburgh towards the end of 1768, and immediately began a Grand Tour on the continent accompanied by Robert Listen. Under his guidance, Johnes travelled through France, Spain, and Italy. They next went to Switzerland, followed the Rhine as far as Strasburgh and crossed through Alsace-Lorraine to Paris, where they lived for several months. Returning from the trip in the year 1771, Johnes remained nearly three years in Herefordshire society, and in the rural pursuits suited to his age. In the year 1774, however, tired of a life of pleasure, he was determined to devote himself to more worthy and more important causes; he ran as candidate for the borough of Cardigan and was opposed by Sir Robert Smith. Johnes eventually won by petition.

After completing studies at the University of Edinburgh, Johnes matriculated at Jesus College, Oxford, where he obtained the degree of M.A. on 8 July 1783. His first acquaintance with Lord Thurlow first occurred while he was at Oxford.

== Private life ==
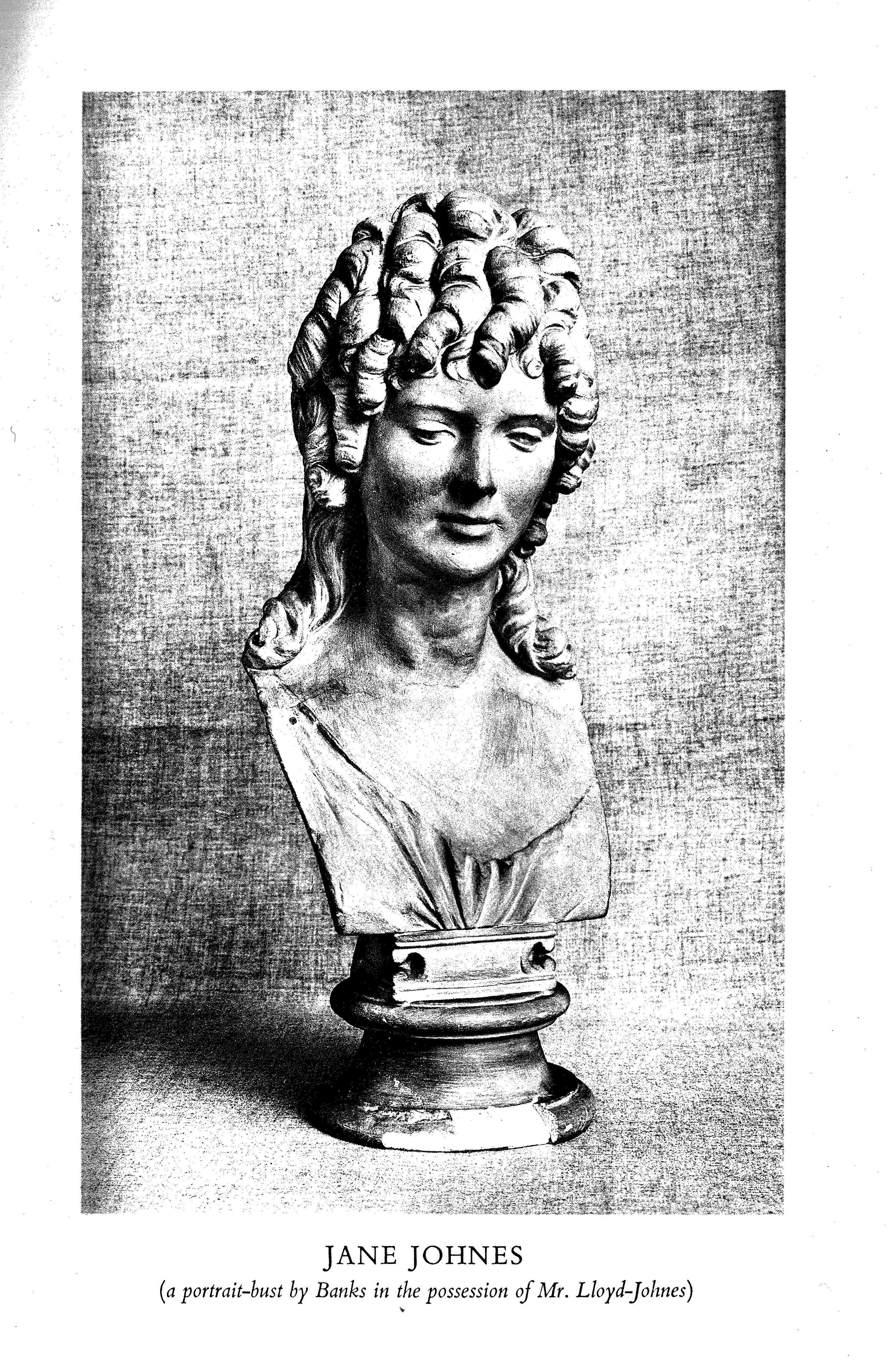
Jane Johnes

In August 1778 at St. Mary's Church, Chepstow, Johnes married Maria Burgh, of Monmouthshire, (died 1782), the only surviving child and heiress of the Rev. Henry Burgh of Parc Llettis. In the same year he was appointed Colonel of the Carmarthenshire Militia. Within a year of marriage, Maria fell ill and died at Bath leaving no children.

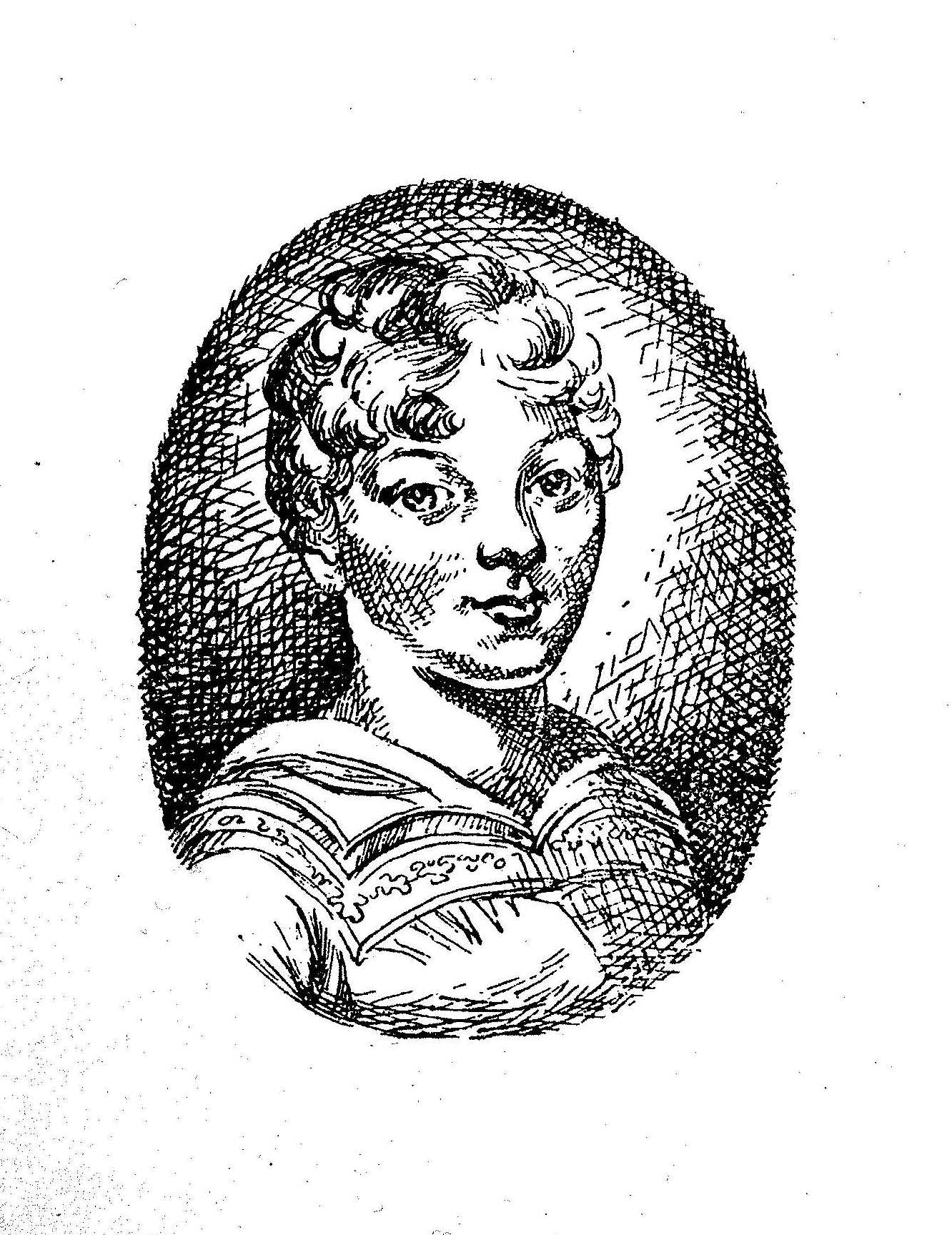
Mariamné Johnes

Before the end of that year, Johnes remarried, to Miss Jane Johnes, his first cousin who was the daughter of John Johnes of Dolaucothi. This caused a tremendous rift within his family that led to a total breakdown in their relationship that lasted through the remainder of Johnes's life. It is not clear if he ever spoke with his mother again after his second marriage took place.

His marriage to his wife Jane, a beautiful and highly intelligent woman, brought great happiness to Thomas. They enjoyed a close relationship, sharing an interest in improving Ceredigion and a love of Hafod.

Their first child Mariamné was born 30 June 1784. Johnes was completely besotted with her and was closely involved with her upbringing. No expense was spared in her education; tutors from all over the world were hired. He shared an especially close emotional bond with Mariamné. He was heartbroken when she predeceased him on 4 July 1811.

His son Evan was born in 1786, during the time his wife Jane had laid the cornerstone of their home. The boy died in infancy.

In the winter of 1814, still grieving the loss of his daughter, and now bankrupt, he became ill and moved to coastal Devon to a house he had recently acquired. He died at Langstone Cliff cottage, near Dawlish on 23 April 1816 aged 68 years. He was buried at Saint Michael's Hafod Church, Eglwys Newydd Parish.

== Political career ==
After returning from his tour of Europe in 1774 he was elected Member of Parliament (MP) for the borough of Cardigan in the following year. He went on to be elected MP for Radnorshire in 1780, 1784, 1790, 1795 and for Cardiganshire in 1796, 1802, 1806, 1807, and 1812. He served as Lord Lieutenant of Cardiganshire from 1800 until his death in 1816, was promoted as a militia officer to Brevet Colonel in the army, and was elected a Fellow of the Royal Society in 1800.

In 1780, the year he lost his father, in respect for him, he vacated his seat for the borough of Cardigan, and offered himself a candidate for the county of Radnor. This step involved him in a second electioneering contest. He was opposed by Walter Williams, Esq. of Maesclough, but after a heated battle was returned as Knight of the Shire.

The parliamentary politics of Mr. Johnes were at this time decidedly ministerial. To Prime Minister North, who was then prime minister, he was attached by the ties of personal friendship, as well as by their agreement in political views. Like the celebrated Gibbon, he gave many a silent, but sincere vote in favour of the American war. His devotion was his reward. In the year 1781, he was appointed His Majesty's Auditor for the Principality of Wales. This office, which was in fact a well paid sinecure[sic], was a few years afterwards proscribed by a bill- of reform: but by a kind consideration, usual in such cases, and in this instance enforced by the powerful interference of Mr. Johnes's intimate friend Lord Chancellor Thurlow, its abolition was deferred till the demise of the existing incumbent. While Chancellor, secured for his friend Mr. Johnes, a life interest in the office of Auditor of the Landed Revenues of South Wales, in direct opposition to the report of a Committee of the Commons; the other, as a member of that House, is said, in return, to have contributed by his vote and influence to the reversionary Tellership granted by act of parliament to his noble friend, in express opposition to the wishes of Mr. Fox, with whom he had lately become connected in politics.

== Hafod Uchtryd Estate ==
Hafod Uchtryd (meaning the summer place of Uchtryd, a name borrowed from the English word Oughtred) was first known in the 16th century as a farm in the Cwmystwyth, a grange of the monastery of Strata Florida in the valley of the Afon Ystwyth, where the pastures are surrounded by high hills in present day Ceredigion near the Cambrian Mountains of Mid Wales. After the dissolution of the monasteries, the farm became the centre of an estate (the Hafod Estate) owned by a branch of the Herbert family. It then passed by the marriage of the Herbert heiress to the Johnes family of Llanfair Clydogau and Dolaucothi.

In 1780 Thomas Johnes inherited the Hafod Estate from his father as was the normal practice within a landed family. During his first visit to the estate and to Wales he was overwhelmed by the rugged beauty of the area, but on moving to the estate in 1783 found it in poor condition, half-ruined, encircled by 10,000 acres (40 km^{2}) of Welsh upland and populated by a hungry, ill-housed, despairing tenancy. He moved them from huts to cottages and employed many of them planting trees on the property. He had both vision and a pragmatic approach to estate management.

=== Mansion ===
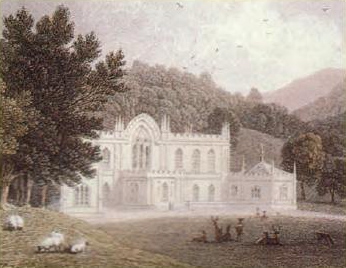
Hafod House, circa 1795 by John Warwick Smith

A new mansion at Hafod was built in 1785 by Johnes, after the demolition of the Herbert structure, from the designs of Thomas Baldwin of Bath in the Gothic style. Johnes collected many rare and noble books on natural history and manuscripts in Welsh, French and Latin, which also included many by Edward Lhuyd and many manuscripts and printed editions of the French chronicles of the later Middle Ages.

On 13 March 1807, a fire broke out that completely destroyed the mansion including the contents of the library. Johnes was in London attending Parliament when he heard the news and that his wife and daughter had escaped. The family moved to a rented house in Castle Hill near Aberystwyth. Baldwin of Bath was again hired as architect. On 1 September that year, on Johnes's birthday, construction to rebuild the mansion began. Contractors had agreed to pay a heavy financial penalty if the mansion house was not roofed-in by Christmas. Expectant upon moving in Johnes set about replacing the contents of the home. Many of the furnishings were purchased from the Palladian mansion known as Fonthill Splendens, owned by William Thomas Beckford and interior French glass doors and a number of chimney mantle pieces were also purchased. These items were stored at Hafod until the mansion was complete. During construction the family left Castle Hill making tours of London and Scotland, each year returning to find the house unfinished. Construction delays continued until Johnes remained in Wales and made weekly visits, personally overseeing the progress. Altogether the project took three years to complete.

== Picturesque landscape ==
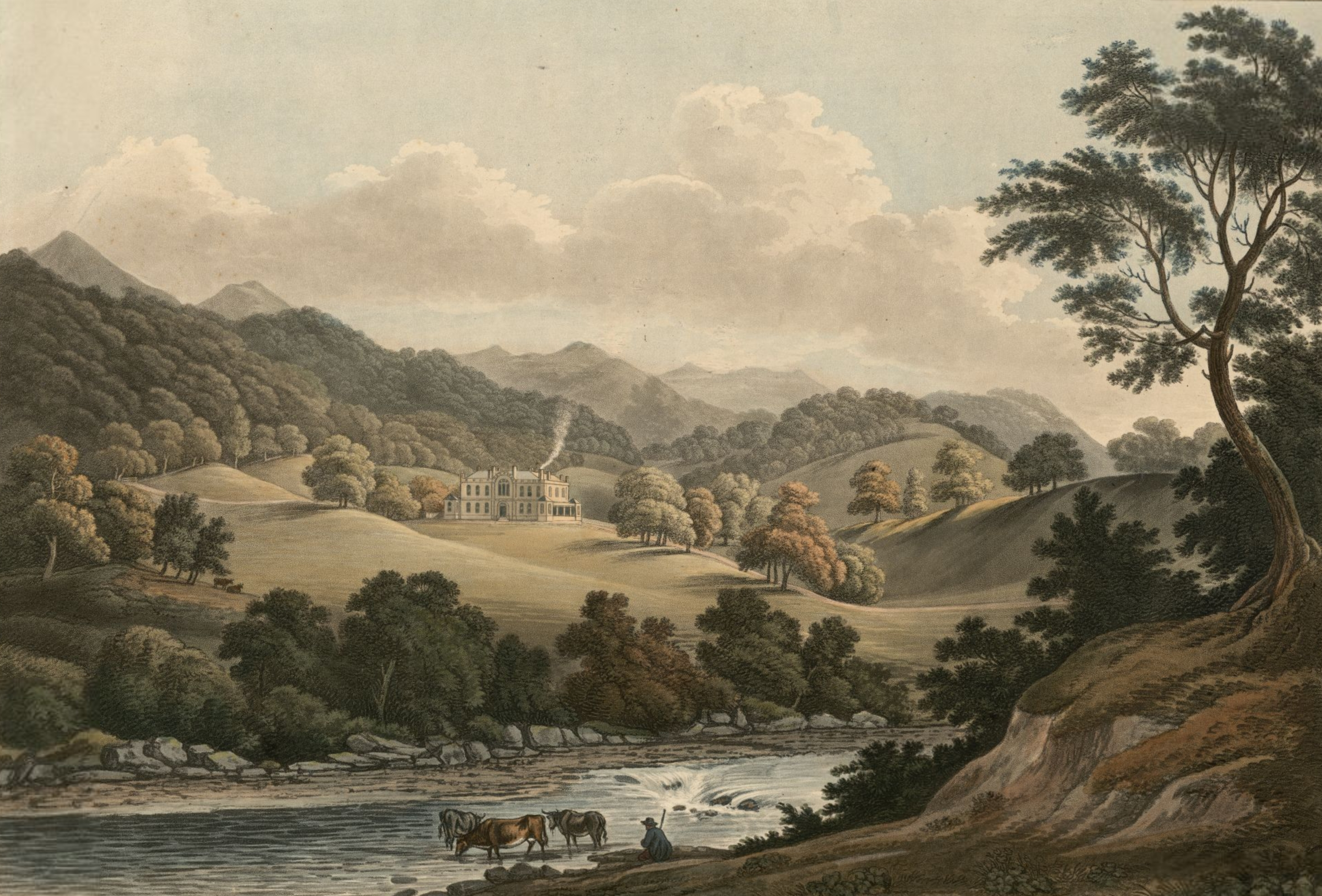
A depiction of the Hafod Estate, circa 1795 by John Warwick Smith

Strongly influenced by William Gilpin's "Picturesque" idea of landscape, which was contrary to the format adopted by the famous Capability Brown, Johnes drew in the experience of his in-laws and family who were from Croft Castle, Herefordshire, his father having married the granddaughter of Richard Payne Knight (1659–1745), a very successful ironmaster whose family acquired land in a fertile part of Herefordshire. The idea of the "Picturesque" developed by Uvedale Price at Foxley and his contemporary (and cousin), Richard Payne Knight's work at Downton were seen by Johnes as a model for the design of his plantations and gardens at Hafod.

Johnes undertook an extensive afforestation on the estate. The number of trees planted from 1796 to 1801 numbered 2,065,000 and continued at a rate of 200,000 per year thereafter. Overall, Johnes planted well over 3 million trees (between 1,000 and 1,200 acres (4.0 and 4.9 km^{2})) at Hafod between 1782 and 1813. In 1801 alone he planted half a million trees.

Following a visit to Hafod in 1798, by Charles Howard, 11th Duke of Norfolk, the president of the Royal Society of Arts (RSA), Johnes was encouraged to offer himself for the awards made by the Society for silviculture.

Between 1790 and 1810 were the golden years at Hafod. Between 1782 and 1813 approximately 405 to 485 hectares (1000–1200 acres) of forest, mainly European Larch and Scots Pine were planted on high ground, with oak and beech on the lower, more fertile land. In spite of two months of little rain, of the 80,000 Larch planted in April 1796, only 200 died. Following a visit to the estate in 1798 by Charles Howard, 11th Duke of Norfolk, the president of the Royal Society of Arts (RSA), Johnes was encouraged to offer himself for the awards made by the Society for silviculture. He was awarded five Gold Medals as follows:

- 1800 – The Gold Medal, being the Premium offered for planting Larch – Trees was this Session adjudged to Thomas Johnes MP of Hafod.
- 1801 – The Gold Medal, being the Premium offered for sowing, planting, and inclosing Timber-trees, was this Session adjudged to Thomas Johnes MP of Hafod.
- 1802 – The Gold Medal, being the Premium offered for sowing, planting, and enclosing Timber-trees was this session adjudged to Thomas Johnes MP of Hafod
- 1805 – The Gold Medal of the Society was this Session adjudged to Thomas Johnes MP of Hafod, in Cardiganshire, for his plantations of Oaks.
- 1810 – The Gold Medal of the Society was this Session adjudged to Thomas Johnes, Esq. MP of Hafod in Cardiganshire, for his Plantations of Larch and other trees.

Approximately three million trees were planted on the estate during the tenancy of Colonel Johnes.

Without doubt, Thomas Johnes was the pioneer of upland afforestation in Wales. However, the achievement was not his alone. Throughout his years at Hafod, Thomas Johnes employed some outstanding foresters and gardeners.

Between 1790 and 1810 two Scottish men played key roles: John Greenshields, Estate Bailiff and James Todd, Head Gardener who had previously been a gardener at the Royal Botanic Garden Edinburgh. These two men were in charge of the extensive plantations and forest-nursery activity.

Over the following years, many more Scots foresters were to play key roles in the development of silviculture on estates throughout Wales. Of course it was the men and boys who did the actual planting thereby, playing a key role in making Hafod an outstanding experiment in land management. At Hafod planting rates were in the order of 1000 per team of one man and a boy per day.

== Eglwys Newydd church ==
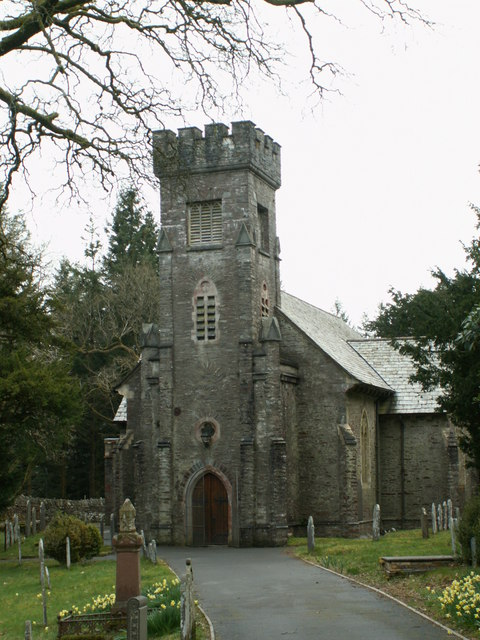
The Saint Michael's Hafod, Eglwys Newydd church

In 1803 Johnes hired James Wyatt, architect of Broadway Tower and Fonthill Abbey, to design a church for the estate to replace the existing structure established in 1620 by William Herbert of the Herbert family, which had fallen into disuse and was surrounded by bramble.

The cruciform structure, constructed at the sole expense of Johnes, was designed in Gothic architecture, has a square tower at the west end. In the centre of the cross is a richly ornamented font of artificial stone, supported on an octagonal shaft; one side of the basin bears a shield charged with the arms of the family of Johnes, and the faces of the shaft are embellished with figures representing the cardinal virtues. A painting, by Fuseli, of Christ and the two disciples of Emmaus is installed in the northern transept. The southern window was composed of an ancient stained and painted Renaissance Flemish glass had been installed in Cardigan Priory church; Johnes removed the window from that church for his own project at Hafod.

In the fire in 1932, a sculpture monument by Francis Legatt Chantrey, erected to the memory of the Miss Johnes, which depicted herself and her weeping parents was destroyed after well-meaning fire fighters doused it with water causing it to shatter.

== Farm and dairy ==
New Farm (Welsh: Gelmast), an experimental farm including an extensive dairy was established at Hafod. It was thought that the lands of Hafod and surrounding Cardiganshire were of a type of soil that could not support dairy farming, however in 1800 approximately four tons of cheese and 1,200 pounds (540 kg) of butter were produced. Johnes experimented with varieties of cattle to determine which would produce the most milk. To accomplish these studies, he imported 40 cows from the Netherlands which Johnes referred to has his "Dutch ladies". He was subsequently able to produce Parmesan, Stilton, Cheshire and Gloucestershire cheese at will from his own dairy.

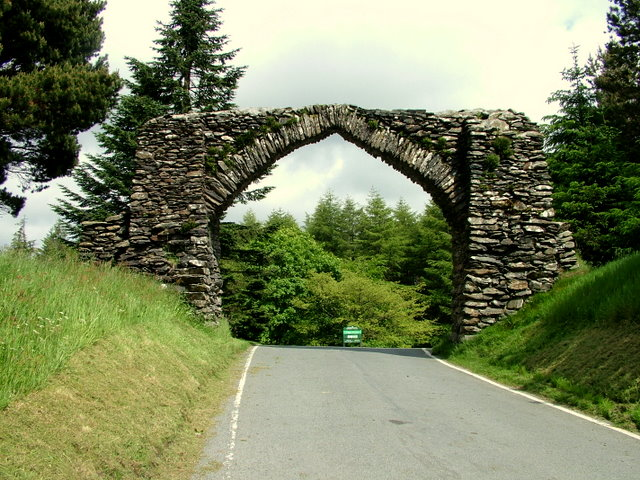
The Arch built in 1810

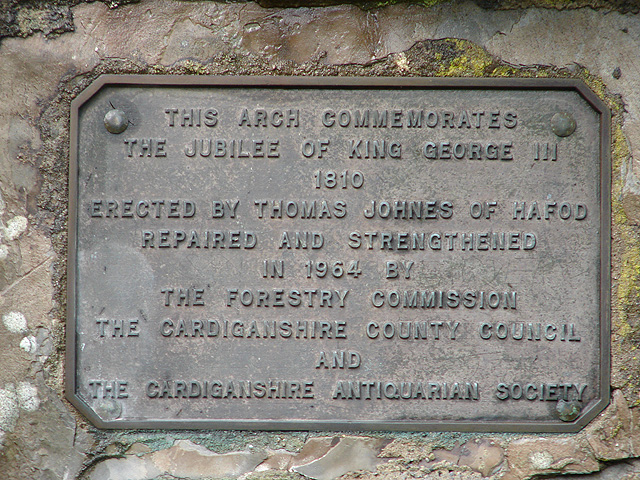
The plaque on the Arch

== Social benefactor ==
Johnes helped to establish the Society for the Encouragement of Agriculture and Industry in the County of Cardiganshire as a way to encourage growth in the surrounding area and to promote modern farming techniques to his tenants. He became very frustrated by their refusal to use equipment as basic as a horse and plough, instead preferring pick and shovel. Farming families from Scotland were brought down into Wales to demonstrate productive techniques, but still the local tenants refused to take example.

The Hafod Arms Hotel, in Devil's Bridge was constructed by Johnes as a way to encourage tourism in Cardiganshire. At the time the estate encompassed present day Pontarfynach.

In addition to his concern for social welfare of those at Hafod, he was extremely interested in improving parts of Cardiganshire and actively involved himself in the building of roads and bridges. Upon inheriting the estate there was not one passable road within its boundaries. He built Hafod Arch in 1810 to commemorate George III's golden jubilee. He also built a school for the poor of the community to attend at no charge. A fund was established to assist families hit by casualties. A physician was brought on staff and medicine was supplied. Each year he and Mrs. Johnes opened up their home at Christmas hosting a large event for everyone at Hafod including staff and tenants.

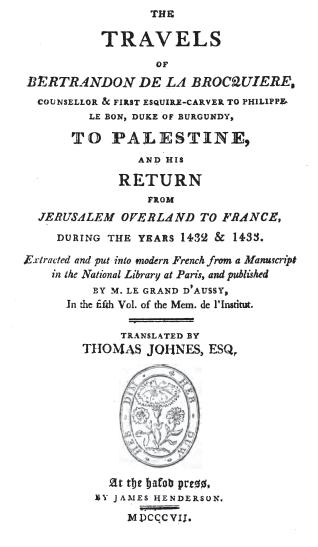
Travels of Bertrandon de la Broquière in Palestine 1807, 8 volumes, (Printed at Hafod Press)

== Writer, translator and printer ==
At the suggestion of his wife Jane, Johnes translated several books from French to English. He established a private press (Hafod Press) in a cottage in the hills away from the main estate to publish his works:

=== As author ===
- A Cardiganshire Landlord's Advice to his Tenants (also published in Welsh; both editions printed at Hafod Press, 1800)

=== As translator ===
- Jean-Baptiste de La Curne de Sainte-Palaye, Memoirs of the Life of Froissart, 1801. (On Google Books)
- Jean Froissart, The Chronicles of England, France, Spain, 4 volumes, 1806.
- Jean de Joinville, Memoirs of John Lord de Joinville, 1807, 2 volumes, (Printed at Hafod Press)
- Bertrandon de la Broquière, Travels of Bertrandon de la Brocquiere in Palestine, 1807 (Printed at Hafod Press). (On Google Books)
- Enguerrand de Monstrelet, The Chronicles of Enguerrand de Monstrelet, 4 volumes, 1809 (reprinted in two volumes, 1840, 1849)

== Legacy ==
Today the Hafod Estate continues to reflect the vision of Thomas Johnes. In Welsh, this is captured in the portmanteau word Welsh: cynefin meaning 'the landscape with everything in it' – place, people and nature intertwined.

The Hafod Trust and the Forestry Commission, the current owners, endeavour to preserve and enhance the landscape of Thomas Johnes.

== Sources ==
- Burke, John and Bernard (1847). Burke's Genealogical and Heraldic History of the Landed Gentry. London: H. Colburn.
- Lee, Sidney, ed. (1892). "Johnes, Thomas" . Dictionary of National Biography. Vol. 30. London: Smith, Elder & Co.
- Moore-Colyer, R. J. (2004). "Johnes, Thomas (1748–1816)". Oxford Dictionary of National Biography (online ed.). Oxford University Press. doi:10.1093/ref:odnb/14861. (Subscription, Wikipedia Library access or UK public library membership required.)
- Conservation of Building and Decorative Stone, By John Ashurst, Francis G. Dimes, 1998. Butterworth-Heinemann. 1998. ISBN 978-0-7506-3898-2.
- The Annual Biography and Obituary for the Year 1817. London: Longman, Hurst, Rees, Orme, and Brown. 1817.
- "The Hafod Collection-Complete; Documentation from 1700 to 1940" (PDF). Ceredigion Records Office. Archived from the original (PDF) on 7 September 2008.
- "RSA Trees, the Spirit of Planting". The Royal Society for the encouragement of Arts, Manufactures & Commerce. Archived from the original on 24 October 2008.
- Banks, Thomas (1790). "Thetis dipping Achilles into the River Styx". Victoria and Albert Museum: V&A Images. Archived from the original (jpg) on 29 January 2009.
- Rose, B.D., Reverend Hugh James (1857). A New General Biographical Dictionary. London: King's College, London.
- "The National Library of Wales, Welsh Biography Online".
- Grigson G (1949) Places of the Mind Routledge & Kegan Paul
- Ingrams R & Piper J (1983) Piper's Places, Chatto & Windus/Hogarth Press, ISBN 0-7011-2550-0
- Linnard, W. (1971) Forestry 44 Journal of the Royal Forestry Society pp 139–140
- Linnard W. (2000) Welsh Woods and Forests – A History, Gomer Press, ISBN 1-85902-864-0
- Gibson W. (1990) Thomas Johnes of Hafod Royal Society of Arts Journal (Study Group for the Society's History) ISSN 0958-0433
- Jenkins, Dafydd "Johnes, Thomas (1748–1816), landowner and man of letters
- Honourable Society of Cymmrodorion (1959) Ed.
- Sir J. E. Lloyd, Dictionary of Welsh Biography down to 1940, B. H. Blackwood Ltd
- Society of Arts (1800) Transactions Vol 18 pp. 81–83
- Society of Arts (1800) Transactions Vol 18 pp. 134–139
- Society of Arts (1801) Transactions Vol 19 pp. 78–81
- Society of Arts (1802) Transactions Vol 20 pp. 182–191
- Society of Arts (1805) Transactions Vol 23 pp. 26–29
- Society of Arts (1810) Transactions Vol 28 pp. 30–32
- Elizabeth Inglis-Jones (1950). Peacocks in Paradise. Faber & Faber, Ltd.
- Jennifer Macve (2004). The Hafod Landscape. Hafod trust. ISBN 0-9527941-1-X.
- George Cumberland (1996) [1796]. An Attempt to Describe Hafod. Hafod trust. ISBN 0-9527941-0-1., includes a map engraved by William Blake and pencil sketches by Thomas Johnes.
- David Yerburgh (2000). An Attempt to Depict Hafod. Hafod trust. ISBN 0-9535635-1-0., a modern photographic parallel to 'An Attempt to Describe Hafod'
- Johnes, Thomas; Richard J. Moore-Colyer (1992). A Land of Pure Delight: Selections from the Letters of Thomas Johnes of Hafod, Cardiganshire, 1748–1816. Gomer. ISBN 0-86383-751-4.

Parliament of Great Britain
Preceded by Sir Robert Smyth, Bt	Member of Parliament for Cardigan Boroughs; 1775–1780	Succeeded by John Campbell
Preceded by Thomas Johnes	Member of Parliament for Radnorshire; 1780–1796	Succeeded by Walter Wilkins
Preceded by Earl of Lisburne	Member of Parliament for Cardiganshire; 1796–1800	Succeeded by Parliament of the United Kingdom
Parliament of the United Kingdom
Preceded by Parliament of Great Britain	Member of Parliament for Cardiganshire; 1801–1816	Succeeded by William Edward Powell
Honorary titles
Preceded by The Earl of Lisburne	Lord Lieutenant of Cardiganshire; 1800–1816	Succeeded by William Edward Powell
