= James Merigot =

French engraver and aquatinter (1760–1824)

James Merigot (1760–1824), also Jacques Mérigot (or Jacques-François Mérigot II, J. Mérigot), was a French engraver and publisher who pursued much of his career in London. He was the son of the Parisian publisher Jacques-François Mérigot I.

He produced 20 aquatints from John Warwick Smith's watercolours to illustrate Views of the Lakes of Cumberland, with twenty aquatints by James Merigot (1791–5). He also did the engravings for A select collection of views and ruins in Rome and its vicinity – recently executed from drawings made upon the spot (1815). He wrote an artists' manual for amateurs in 1821.

== Gallery ==
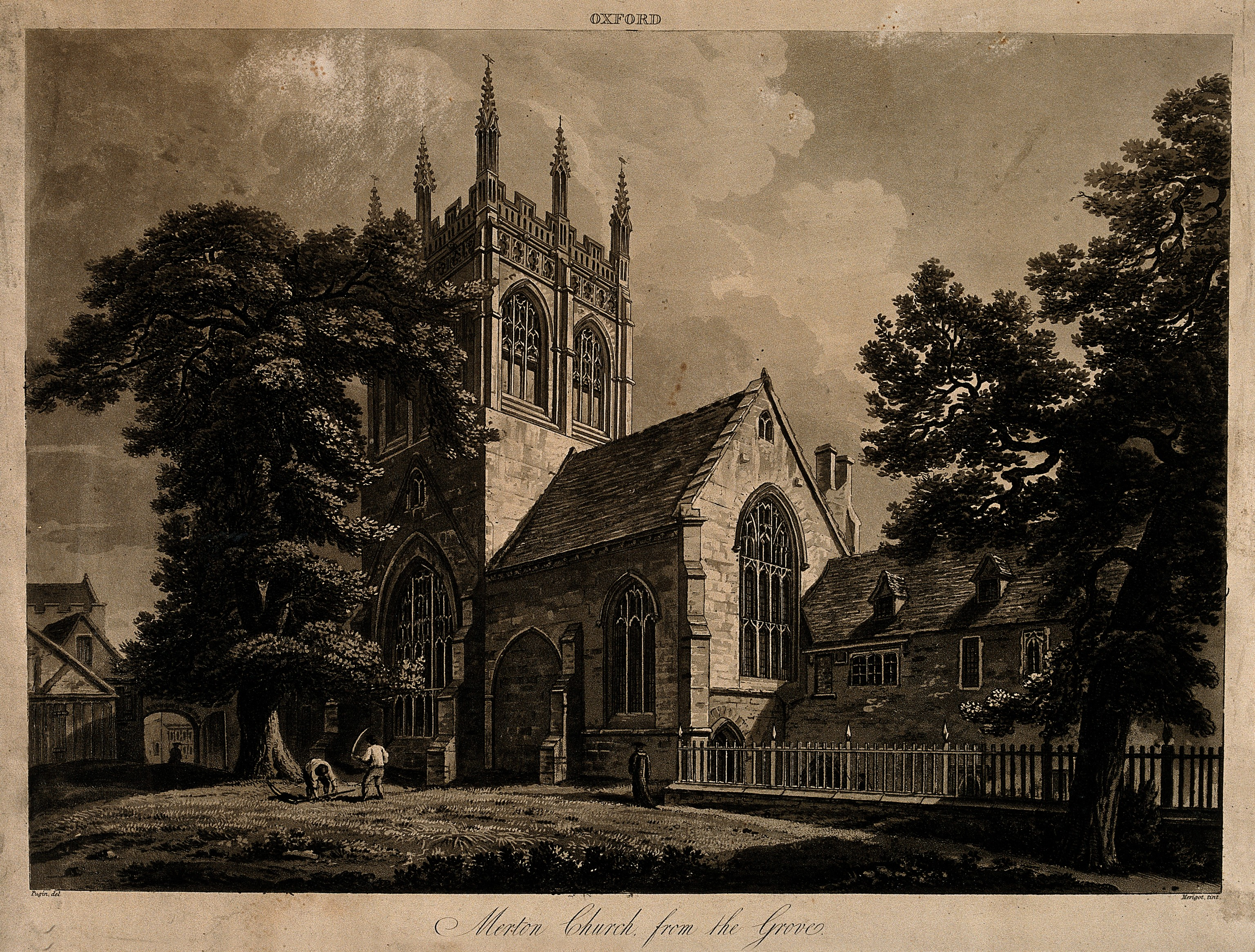
Merton College, Oxford: the chapel

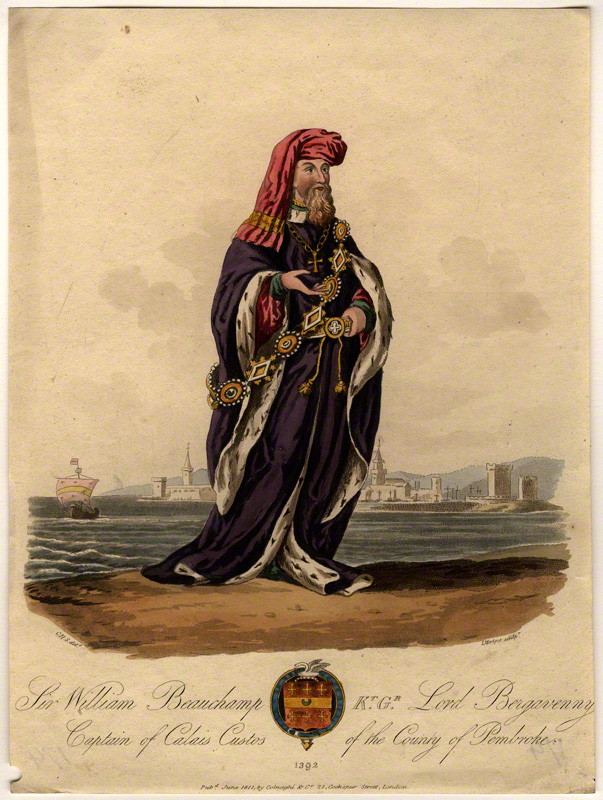
William Beauchamp, 1st Baron Bergavenny

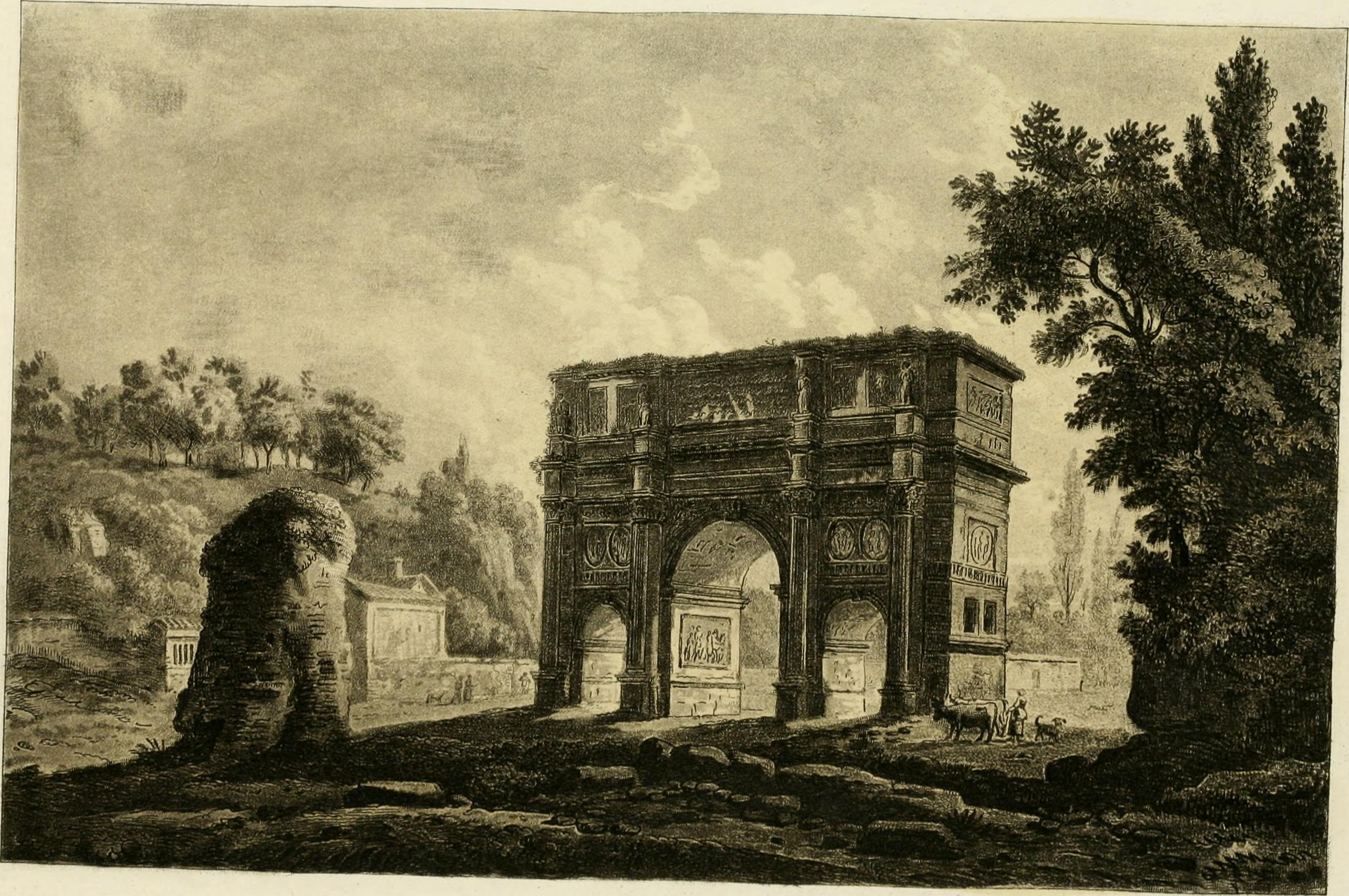
A select collection of views and ruins in Rome and its vicinity, 1815

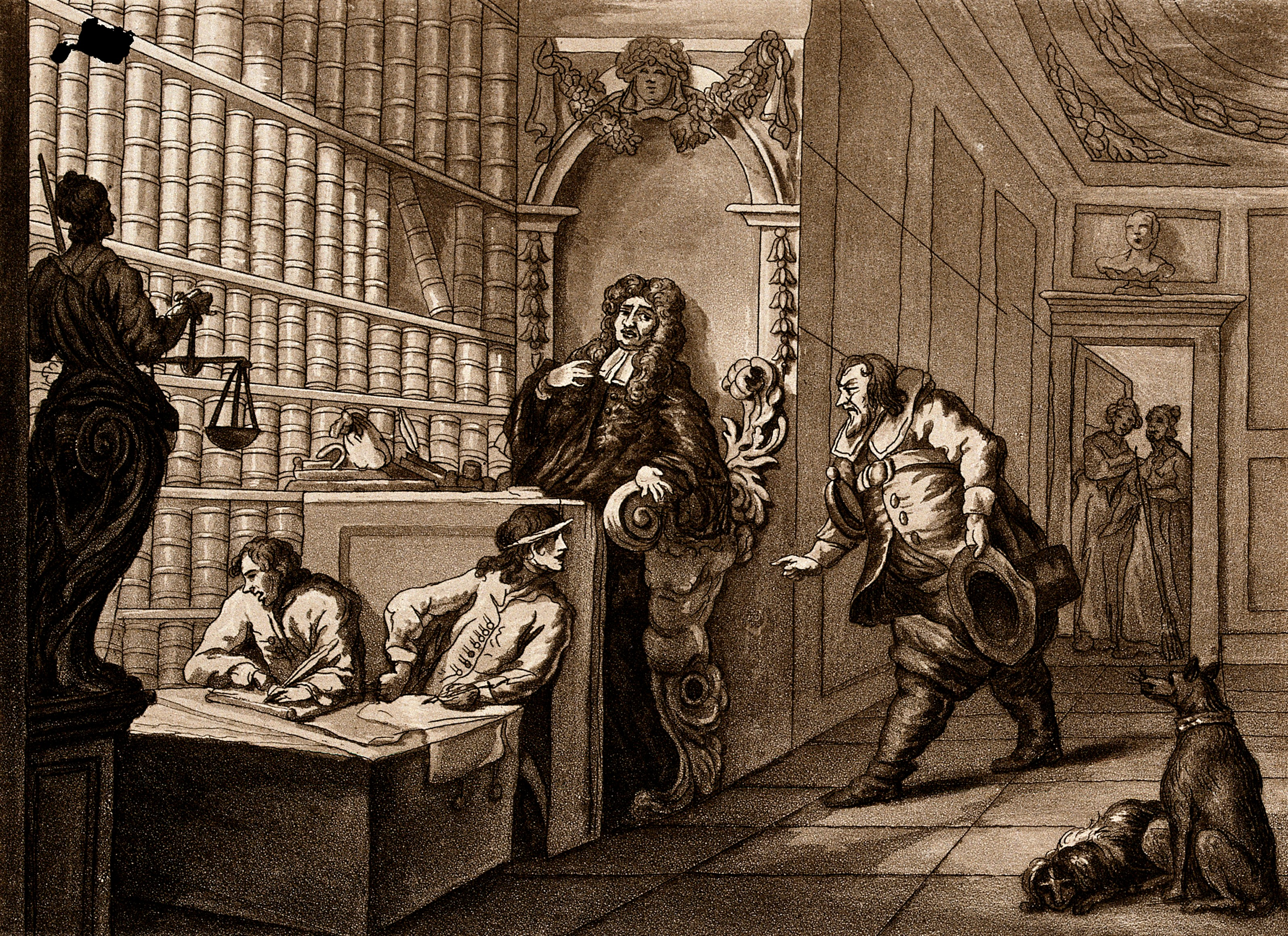
Hudibras addresses a lawyer who sits in an elaborately decorated room
