= Gustaf Erik Hasselgren =

Swedish painter and etcher (1781–1827)

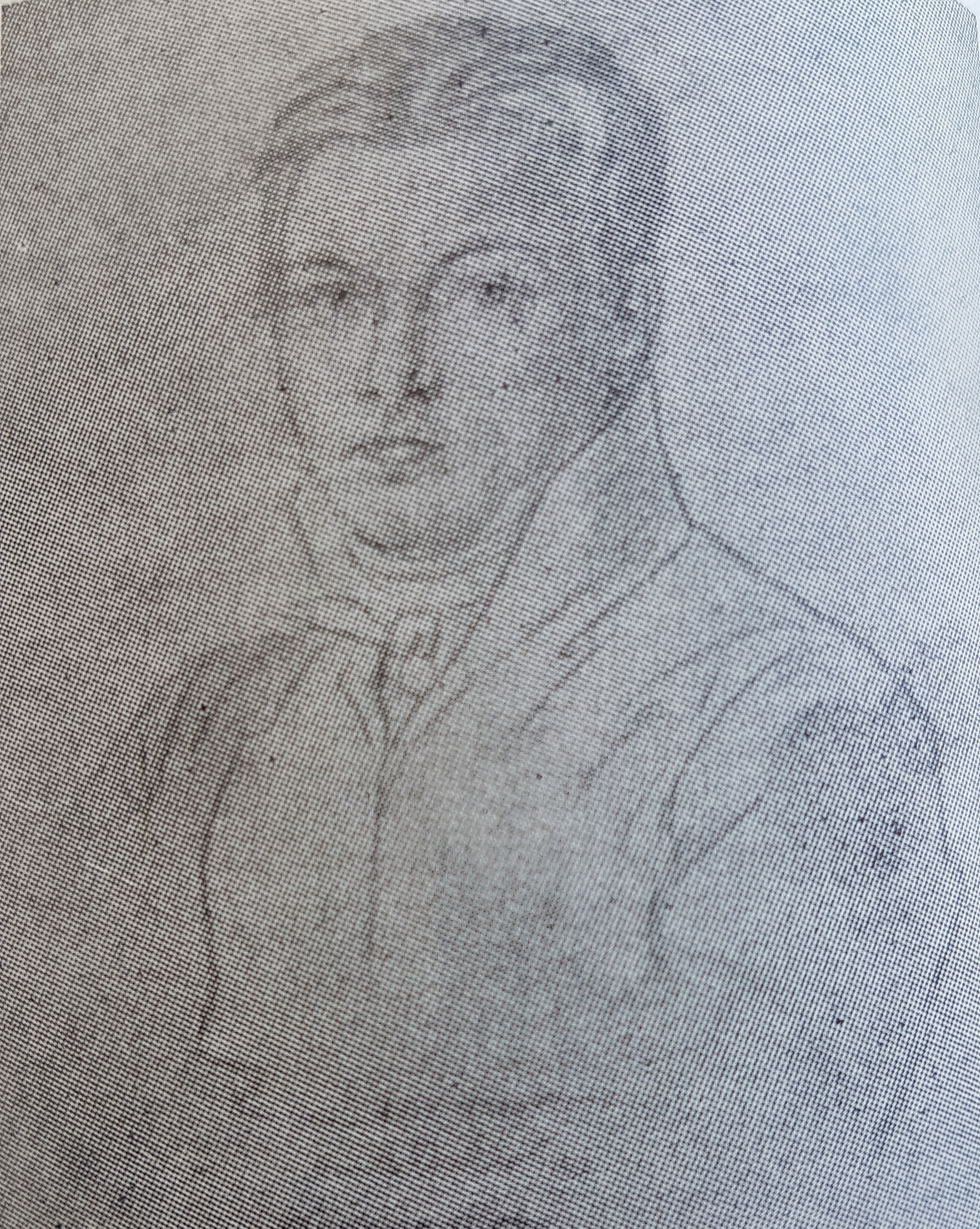
Gustaf Hasselgren; sketch by Rudolph Suhrlandt

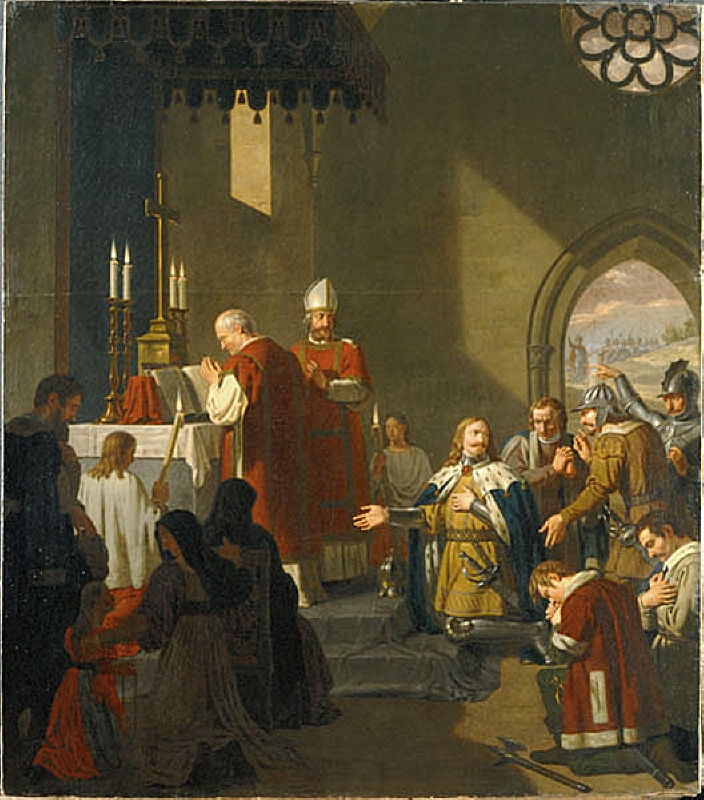
The Arts and Virtues at the Tomb of Gustav III, before 1816

Gustaf Erik Hasselgren (15 November 1781 — 9 March 1827) was a Swedish painter and etcher. He specialized in Biblical and historical subjects.

== Biography ==
He was born in Stockholm. His father, Erik Gustaf Hasselgren, was the local head of the security guard; a position akin to police chief. From 1798, he studied with Pehr Hilleström at the Royal Swedish Academy of Fine Arts, where his works, largely historical in nature, were awarded several medals, including the academy's first silver medal in 1803. He became an agré (a type of member-candidate) in 1804 and received a major travel scholarship in 1806.

He first went to Berlin, where he stayed for a year, but was not able to accomplish much, due to an illness. This was followed by three years in Dresden and one year in Vienna, before he settled in Italy. He remained there for five years; becoming associated with the German art colony and befriending Johann Friedrich Overbeck, one of the major figures in the Nazarene movement.

During his travels (in 1812), he had been named a full member of the academy. In 1816, he returned to Sweden to succeed Hilleström as Professor of figure painting. The following year, he married the artist Anna Catharina Åbom.

His larger works include a "Resurrection of Christ", which is in Saint James's Church, Stockholm, and a depiction of "Ragnar Lodbrok", which was commissioned by King Karl XIV Johan. His works may also be seen at the Nationalmuseum and the Norrköpings konstmuseum.

Hasselgren died in Stockholm on 9 March 1827.
