= Emanuel Limnell =

Swedish artist (1764–1861)

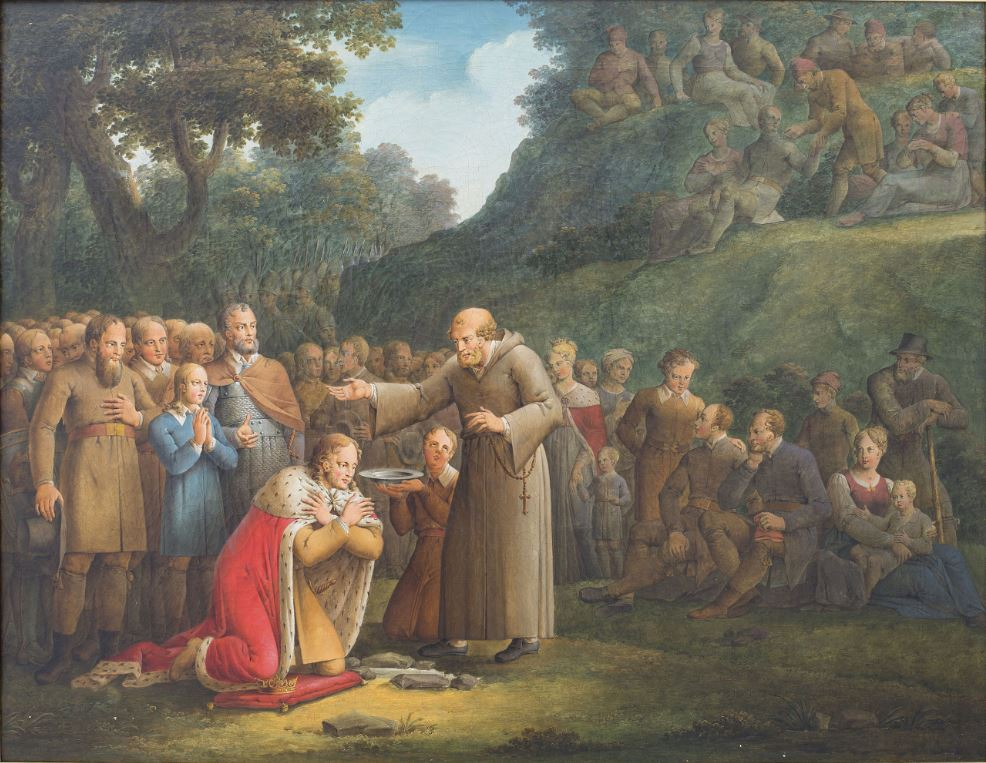
King Olof Skötkonung being baptized by Bishop Sigfrid

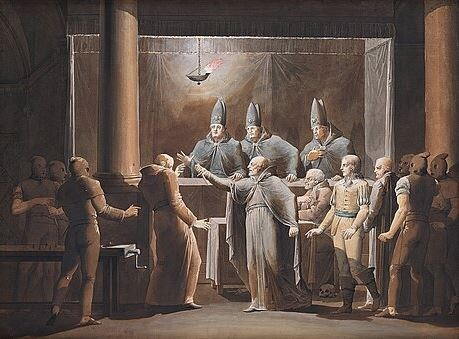
Scene from The Italian, by Ann Radcliffe

Per Emanuel Limnell (24 March 1766, Karlskrona – 2 March 1861, Stockholm) was a Swedish decorative painter and watercolorist.

== Biography ==
He was the eighteenth child born to a shipyard maintenance worker. After his mother's death, when he was seven, he ran away from home and spent five years living with an old village school teacher. The teacher also died, and he had to support himself for several years. He returned home in 1781 and helped his father paint ships, but found the work unpleasant; preferring to paint coffins, sledges, chests and similar items for the local peasants.

In 1784, thanks to assistance from Admiral Carl Tersmeden, he was able to go to Stockholm and find employment in the stage decoration workshop at the Royal Swedish Opera. There, his work drew the attention of Johan Gottlob Brusell and Louis Jean Desprez, who took him on as a personal apprentice. In 1791, he was hired as a regular decorative painter there; a position he would hold well into the 19th century.

On the advice of Desprez and the sculptor, Johan Tobias Sergel, he used the model school at the Royal Swedish Academy of Fine Arts to improve his skills and promote himself. In 1802, he was chosen as an agré (member-candidate) at the Academy and, the following year, was awarded full membership. In 1812, he was named a Professor of drawing and, in 1813, was appointed a court painter.

He married Ulrika Wargentin in 1791. Their daughter, Anna Maria Limnell, also became an artist.

His works may be seen at the Nationalmuseum, the Norrköpings konstmuseum and the Uppsala University Library.
