= Mining in Wales =

Overview of the mining industry in Wales

A Welsh miner at Tower Colliery

Mining in Wales provided a significant source of income to the economy of Wales throughout the nineteenth century and early to mid twentieth century. It was key to the Industrial Revolution in Wales, and to the whole of Great Britain.

Wales was famous for its coal mining, in the Rhondda Valley, the South Wales Valleys and throughout the South Wales coalfield and by 1913 Barry had become the largest coal exporting port in the world, with Cardiff as second, as coal was transported down by rail. Northeast Wales also had its own coalfield. Tower Colliery (closed January 2008) near Hirwaun in South Wales is regarded by many as the oldest open coal mine and one of the largest in the world. Welsh coal was regarded as some of the best burning and highest quality material for power generation, railroading, shipping, and was sold for higher prices. Wales has also had a significant history of mining for slate, gold and various metal ores, making it one of the most materially rich plains in the world.

== History ==
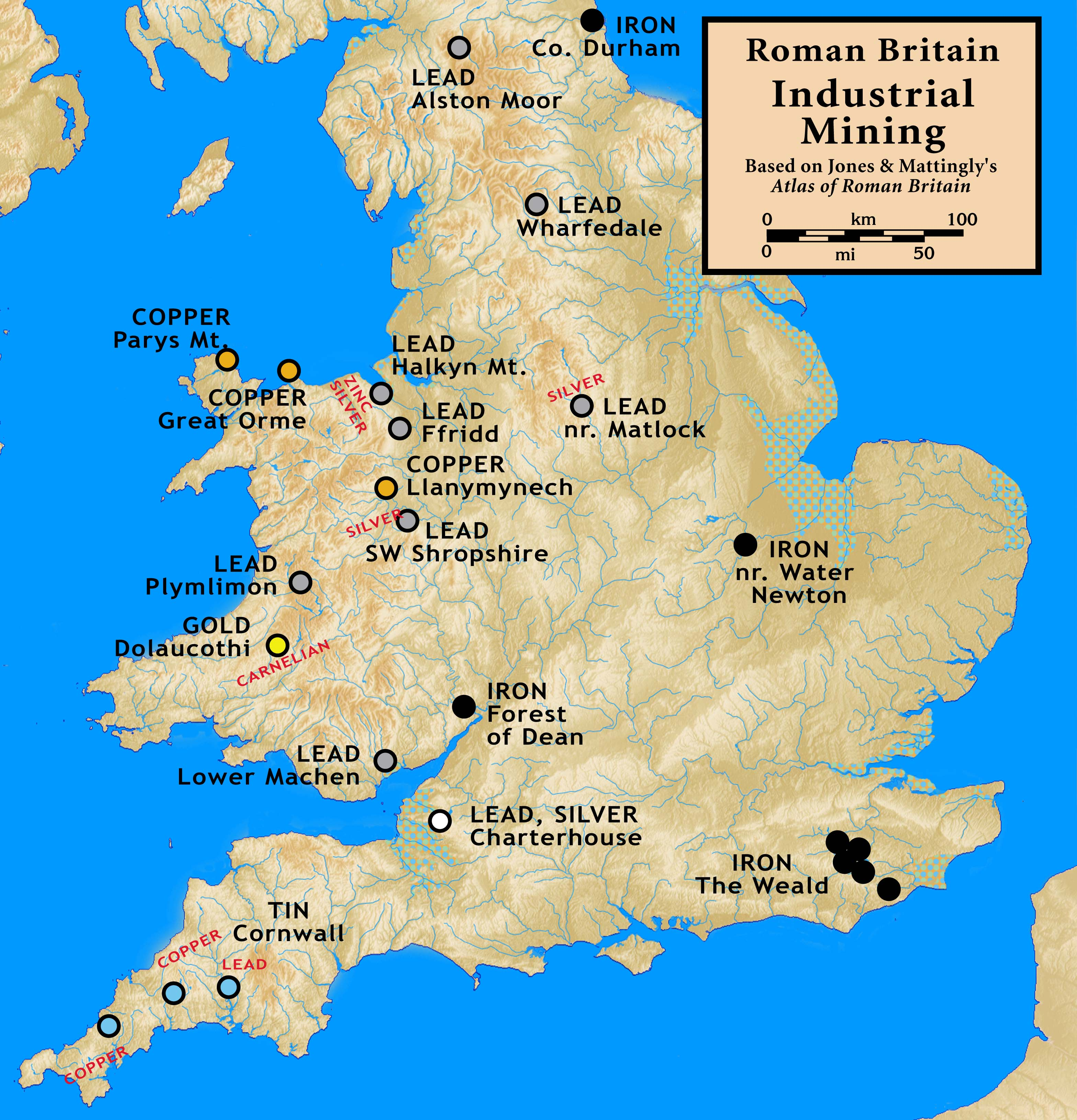

There had been small-scale mining in Wales in the pre-Roman British Iron Age, but it would be undertaken on an industrial scale under the Romans, who completed their conquest of Wales in AD 78. Substantial quantities of gold, copper, and lead were extracted, along with lesser amounts of zinc and silver. Mining would continue until the process was no longer practical or profitable, at which time the mine would be abandoned. The extensive excavations of the Roman operations at Dolaucothi provide a picture of the high level of Roman technology and the expertise of Roman engineering in the ancient era. Soon after the fall of the Roman empire, mining quickly became unprofitable. In the 1600s, around the age of an increased population, slate mining had started, and by the 1750s, the mining industry there had struck almost every type of material imaginable, making it a hub of mining.

=== Coal mining ===
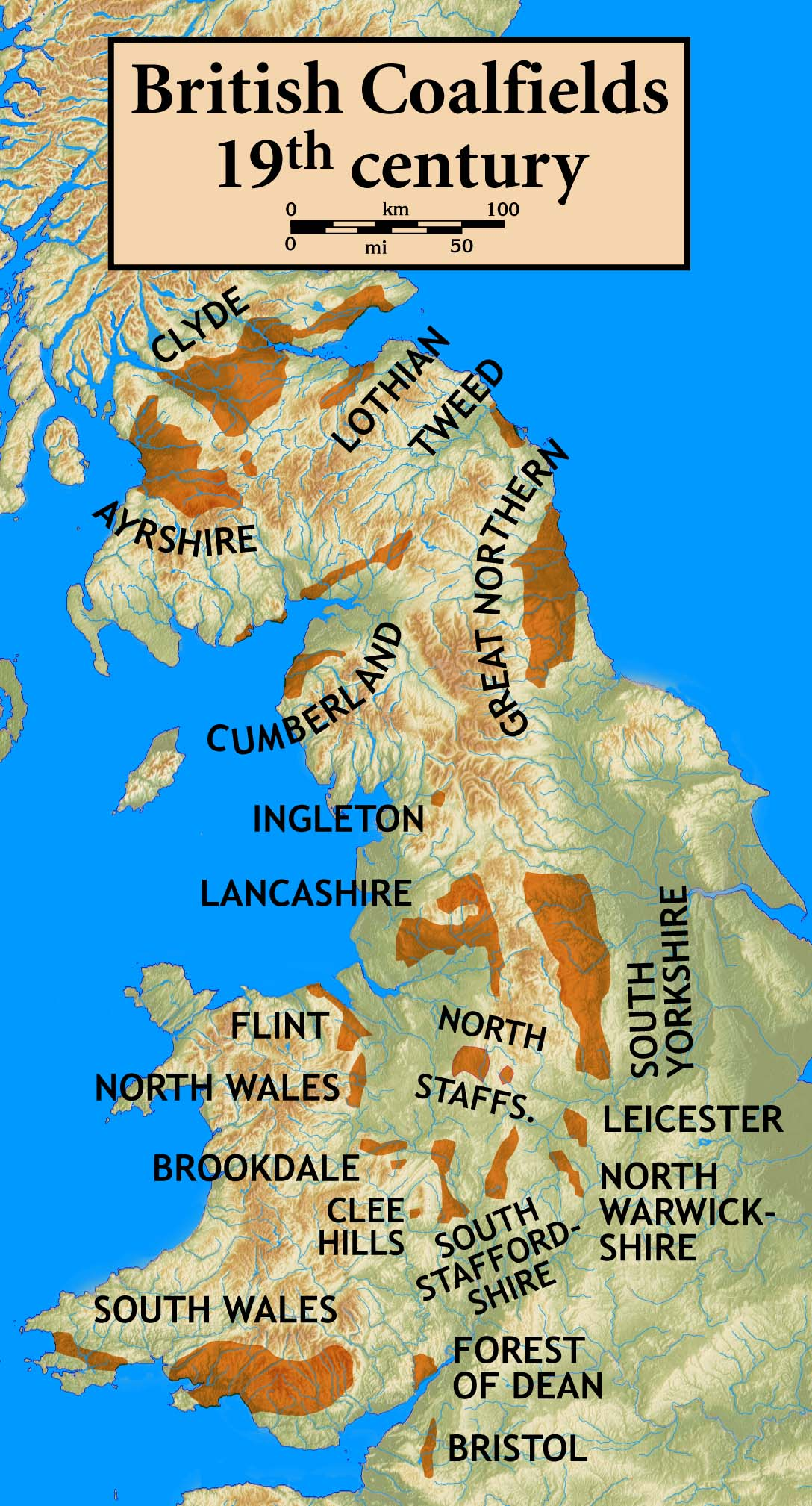

During the first half of the nineteenth century mining was often at the centre of working-class discontent in Wales, and a number of uprisings such as the Merthyr Rising in 1831 against employers were a characteristic of the Industrial Revolution in Wales, Dic Penderyn became a martyr to industrial workers. The Chartist movement and the 1839 Newport Rising showed the growing concerns and awareness of the work force of their value to the nation.

There is a well-known mining song part in Welsh and part in English:

I am a little collier and gweithio underground
The raff will never torri when I go up and down
It's bara when I'm hungry
And cwrw when I'm dry
It's gwely when I'm tired
And nefoedd when I die

The complete English translation is as follows:

I am a little collier and working underground
The rope will never break when I go up and down
It's bread when I'm hungry
And beer when I'm dry
It's bed when I'm tired
And heaven when I die

Despite the discontent, many miners continued to work, powering the global economy at their expense.

==== Government schemes to assist disabled coal miners ====
Post-World War II, the decline of the Welsh coal industry prompted efforts to re-employ miners with disabilities, many of whom suffered from pneumoconiosis (a lung disease prevalent among miners). Exacerbating the structural and economic nature of this crisis was The 1943 Workmen's Compensation Act, a landmark law addressing pneumoconiosis. However, it had a major drawback: only miners who worked between 1934 and 1942 were eligible for compensation. This left out many miners who had developed the disease before 1934 and were now disabled, denying them crucial support. The Grenfell scheme, named after MP Dai Grenfell, aimed to establish factories in South Wales that would employ a high proportion of disabled workers. Ten new factories were established across South Wales, in towns like Ammanford, Garnant, Tonypandy, and Ystalyfera.The total cost for this construction project reached £400,000. Historian Steven Thompson of Aberystwyth University, states that those behind the Grenfell scheme were keen to avoid creating a system where disabled miners felt isolated or inferior. They sought to avoid these workers being segregated in "sheltered" workplaces, but instead integrated into regular factory environments. This meant that miners with pneumoconiosis would work alongside 'healthy' colleagues in standard industrial settings, contributing to the factory's commercial operation. The factories were incentivized with rent reductions to encourage businesses to participate. However, the scheme faced challenges, including difficulty attracting tenants and unstable employment opportunities due to many factories exclusively producing luxury goods, for whom demand was fickle and often low. Other criticism was that the factories should have been operated by state-owned enterprises creating equipment for nationalised sectors of the British economy, versus being fully private-sector driven. Ultimately, the Grenfell scheme had only limited success in reducing disabled unemployment.

In contrast, the Remploy scheme, a government initiative, focused on providing sheltered employment for severely disabled individuals (including, but not limited to former coal miners) in need of specialized working conditions. Remploy factories were non-competitive and non-profit, receiving government subsidies to cover higher operating costs. The first Remploy factory in Britain opened in Bridgend in 1946, and by the mid-1950s, over a sixth of all Remploy workers in Britain were located in Wales. While historians note it is difficult to assess Remploy's overall success in the context of disabled Welsh coal miners specifically, it played a vital role in offering social and economic support to those excluded from mainstream employment.

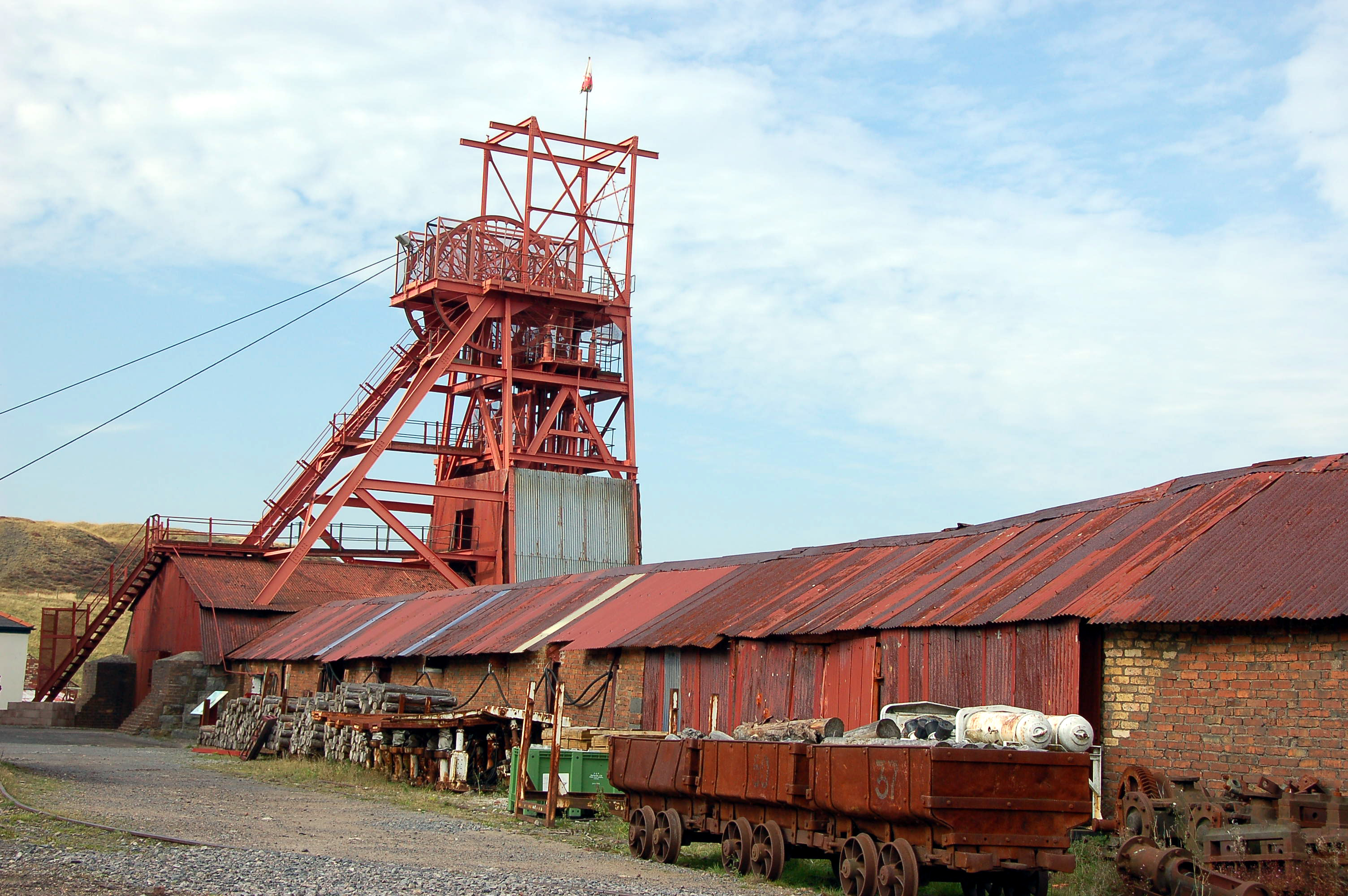
Big Pit museum at Blaenavon

=== Big Pit National Coal Museum & other mining museums in Wales ===
Other museums preserving the memories and heritage of the coal mining industry in Wales are at:

- South Wales Miners' Museum near Cymmer
- Cefn Coed Colliery Museum near Crynant
- Rhondda Heritage Park near Trehafod

=== Slate quarrying ===
There has been slate quarrying in Wales since the Roman period, when slate was used to roof the fort at Segontium, now Caernarfon. The slate industry grew slowly until the early 18th century, then expanded rapidly until the late 19th century, at which time the most important slate producing areas were in northwest Wales, including the Penrhyn Quarry near Bethesda, the Dinorwic Quarry near Llanberis, the Nantlle Valley quarries, and Blaenau Ffestiniog, where the slate was mined rather than quarried. Penrhyn and Dinorwig were the two largest slate quarries in the world, and the Oakeley mine at Blaenau Ffestiniog was the largest slate mine in the world. Slate is mainly used for roofing, but is also produced as thicker slab for a variety of uses including flooring, worktops and headstones.

The slate industry in North Wales gained World Heritage Site status in 2021, whilst Welsh slate has been designated by the International Union of Geological Sciences as a Global Heritage Stone Resource.

=== Metal mining ===
Metal mining in Wales affected large areas of what are now very rural parts of Wales and left behind a legacy of contaminated waste heaps and a very few ruined buildings.

There are a number of areas that have been mined for a variety of metals.

[In Wales,]
Valeys bryngeþ forþ food,
And hilles metal riȝt good

— Ranulf Higden (c. 1280–1364), Polychronicon,

==== Gold mining ====
Gold was mined as early as the Roman period at Dolaucothi in Carmarthenshire and possibly elsewhere. In the 19th century gold was being extracted from a number of small mines at the southern end of Snowdonia with most activity centred in the valley of the River Mawddach and its tributaries.

==== Lead and silver ====
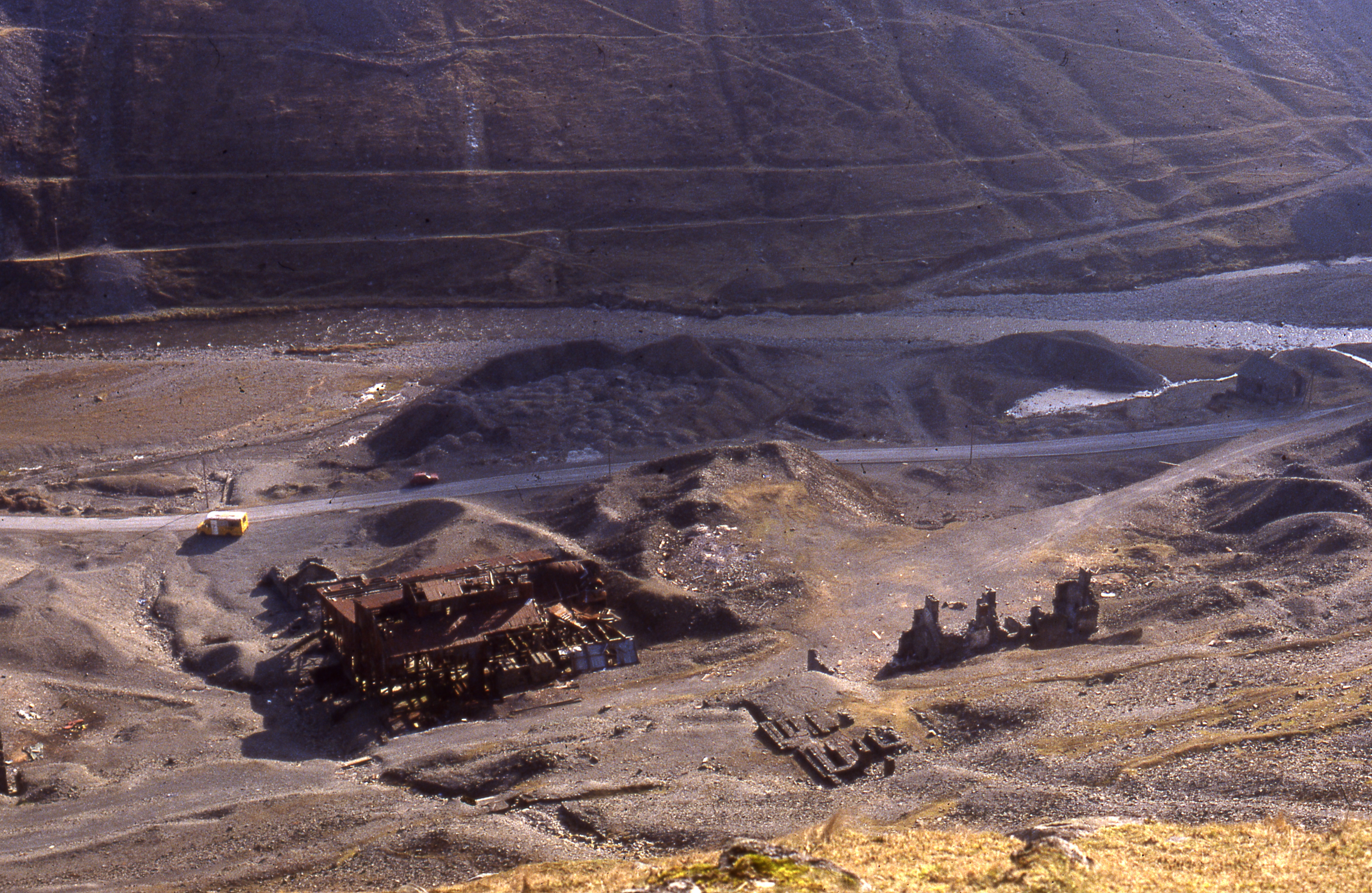
Cwmystwyth Mine from the hill-side immediately above the mine. Winter in 1985 when many buildings were still standing

The principal areas were centred on the upland areas of the River Ystwyth and River Rheidol with some outliers to the east in the catchment of the River Severn and some to the south in the headwaters of the River Teifi. The largest of these mines were the Cwmystwyth and Rheidol United mines in Cwm Rheidol. The ore extracted was galena which in many cases had a high silver content, especially at Cwm Ystwyth. It also occurred alongside large quantities of sphalerite, the principal ore of zinc. However, the zinc was only occasionally processed and much remains on the very extensive discard heaps around the mines.

Amongst the very many mines that have existed the following list identifies those known to have existed between the 17th and 19th centuries in north Cardiganshire and west Montgomeryshire:

Aberffrwd, Alma, Blaenceunant, Blaencwmsymlog, Bron floyd, Bryn Glas, Bwa Drain, Bwlch, Cwm Mawr, Cwmystwyth, Cwm Ystwyth South, Cwm Ystwyth West, Cwmbryno, Cwmdarren, Cwmsymlog, De Broke, Dyffryn Castell, Elgar, Esgair Lle, Esgairmwyn, Fron Goch, Fron Goch East, Gelli, Glog fach, Glog Fawr, Goginan, Goginan west, Graig Goch, Grogwynion, Gwaith coch, Lisburne South, Llwynmalus, Llywernog, Logau Las, Melindwr, Mynyddgorddu, Nanteos, Pen Rhiw, Powell, Rheidol United, Temple, Ystumtuen

Metal mining in the Gwydir Forest dates back to the 17th century, but its heyday came in the latter half of the 19th century. These mines predominantly produced lead and zinc, and the last mine to close – Park Mine – closed in the 1960s.

Smaller areas of lead exploitation included Halkyn Mountain in Flintshire and in the Clyne valley in west Swansea.

==== Copper ====
Copper mining is probably the oldest known mining activity in Wales with documented evidence of Bronze Age mining on the Great Orme near Llandudno and at Copa Hill in the valley of the River Ystwyth in Ceredigion. Further copper discoveries were exploited in Snowdonia just to the east of Beddgelert where the Sygun Copper Mine, within the Snowdonia National Park, gives an idea of the conditions faced by copper miners and is a popular tourist attraction. In the 18th century the massive deposits of copper together with a range of other metals was discovered and exploited at Parys Mountain on Anglesey.

==== Iron ====
Commercial iron ore exploitation has been relatively uncommon in Wales during the last hundred years, despite the dominance of the iron and steel industry in South Wales. However ironstone is a component of the Lower Coal Measures rock sequence and where it outcrops along the northern edge of the South Wales Coalfield, it was extensively worked for the production of iron and was important in the initiation of the Industrial Revolution in South Wales. Commercial exploitation also took place in the Vale of Glamorgan. The Forest of Dean was an important source of iron for many centuries, and dates from at least the Roman period.

==== Lead ====
Lead ore was first mined in North Wales during Roman times at Pentre Halkyn to be smelted at Flint. The lead that was produced there was stamped with the inscription Deceangli, which was the name of the Celtic tribe occupying the area. In the 17th century an intensive period of Welsh lead mining commenced, bringing a large number of miners from Derbyshire into Wales. There are substantial reserves of the metal in Ceredigion, probably first exploited in the Roman period, and extensively during the revival of metal mining in the reign of Queen Elizabeth I.

=== Arsenic ===
Arsenic has been mined in association with metals and in Wales commercial extraction has probably only occurred in the Clyne valley near Swansea.

== Working mines ==
Following the miners' strike, only two deep mines remained working in Wales. Tower Colliery, Hirwaun, had been run by a miner's co-operative since 1994. Due to dwindling coal seams, the colliery was last worked on 18 January 2008, followed by official closure on 25 January. Drift mining continued at Aberpergwm Colliery, a smaller mine closed by the National Coal Board in 1985 but reopened in 1996. Aberpergwm colliery is currently owned and operated by Energybuild and supplies the carbon market. Several other small mines still exist, including the Blaentillery drift mine near to the Big Pit National Coal Museum.

== List of mines in Wales ==
=== Coal ===
- Abercynon Colliery
- Abernant Colliery
- Aberpergwm (anthracite coal, drift mine, active in 2014 with 64 employees (closed)
- Albion Colliery in Cilfynydd, Pontypridd - work began 1884 and the mine closed in 1966
- Bargoed Colliery sunk in 1887, closed 1977.
- Bedwas Navigation Colliery (closed 1985)
- Bersham Colliery (closed 1986)
- Big Pit National Coal Museum
- Blaenant Colliery (closed 1990)
- Bute Merthyr Colliery
- Bwllfa Colliery
- Cambrian Colliery
- Cefn Coed Colliery Museum
- Celynen North Colliery in Newbridge
- Celynen South Colliery in Abercarn (closed 1985)
- Coedely Colliery, Tonyrefail (closed 1985); linked underground to Cwm Colliery Beddau (closed 1986)
- Cynheidre Colliery (closed 1989)
- Darran Colliery, Deri sunk 1868, closed 1919.
- Deep Navigation Colliery, Treharris (closed 1991)
- Ferndale Colliery
- Ffos-y-fran Land Reclamation Scheme (still under consideration as of 2013)
- Garw/Ffaldau Colliery
- Gresford Colliery (closed 1973)
- Great Western Mine
- Groesfaen Colliery, Bargoed. Sunk 1902, closed 1968.
- Hafodyrynys Colliery
- Lady Windsor Colliery in Ynysybwl (closed 1988); linked underground to Abercynon Colliery (Closed 1988)
- Llancaiach Colliery
- Llay Hall Colliery, Cefn y Bedd, North Wales 1877-1947
- Mardy Colliery in Maerdy (closed 1990, site cleared and now occupied by Avon Rubber); linked underground to Tower Colliery
- Marine Colliery in Cwm, Blaenau Gwent, merged with Six Bells Colliery in the 1970s, closed in 1989
- Mostyn Colliery (closed 1887 after flooding)
- Nantgarw Colliery (amalgamated with Windsor Colliery in 1974, closed 1986); deepest pit in the South Wales Coalfield when sunk in 1915
- Navigation Colliery in Crumlin
- Nine Mile Point Colliery at Cwmfelinfach (closed 1964)
- Oakdale Colliery at Ty Mellyn in the Sirhowy Valley (closed 1989; linked to Markham and Celynen North)
- Ogilvie Colliery, Deri, South Wales. Closed 1975.
- Parc Slip Colliery
- Penallta Colliery
- Pentremawr Colliery
- Prince of Wales Colliery in Abercarn closed 1959. Greatest mining disaster in Monmouthshire, 1878.
- Point of Ayr (closed 1996)
- Primrose Colliery
- Seven Sisters anthracite; closed 1963
- Six Bells Colliery in Abertillery, site of the Six Bells Colliery Disaster in 1960, merged with Marine Colliery in the 1970s, closed in 1988
- Taff Merthyr
- Tarenni Colliery
- Tower Colliery (closed 1994 and re-opened after an employees' buy-out by Goitre Tower Anthracite in 1995; closed 2008 after exhaustion of the seam, but with plans to establish an opencast mine in its place)
- Universal Colliery at Senghenydd, site of the Senghenydd Colliery Disaster; converted to a ventilation facility for Windsor Colliery and then closed in 1988
- Windsor Colliery in Abertridwr, Caerphilly; closed 1986
- Wyllie Colliery in the Sirhowy Valley; closed 1968

=== Metal ores ===
- Bryntail lead mine (No longer in use)
- Cilcain lead mine (No longer in use)
- Clogau Gold Mine
- Cwmystwyth Mines
- Dolaucothi Gold Mines
- Great Orme copper
- Gwydir Forest various metal mines
- Gwynfynydd gold mine (No longer in use)
- Klondyke mine lead mine (No longer in use)
- Llywernog Mine silver-lead mine
- Minera Leadmines (No longer in use)
- Nantymwyn lead mine (No longer in use)
- Parys Mountain copper mine
- Sygun Copper Mine (No longer in use as a mine)
- Van Leadmine Llanidloes
- Penrhyn Du mines (no longer in use)

== Popular culture ==
The theme of Public Service Broadcasting's third album, Every Valley, follows the rise and fall of Welsh coal mining. It was recorded in the former steelworks town of Ebbw Vale, Wales, and released on 7 July 2017.

== See also ==
- Coal mining
- Mining accident
- Miners' institute
- Coal tips in Wales
