= Ystwyth =

Ystwyth may refer to:

- River Ystwyth, a river in West Wales, which drains into Cardigan Bay at Aberystwyth
- Ystwyth valley, a location in Wales drained by the River Ystwyth, known for its lead and silver mines and low life expectancy
- Cwm Ystwyth Lead Mine, a disused lead mine in the valley of the River Ystwyth
- Baron Ystwyth, an extinct title in the peerage of the United Kingdom
- Ysbyty Ystwyth, a village in Ceredigion, west Wales
