= Elenydd =

Area of Mid Wales

Coordinates: 52°21′N 3°42′W

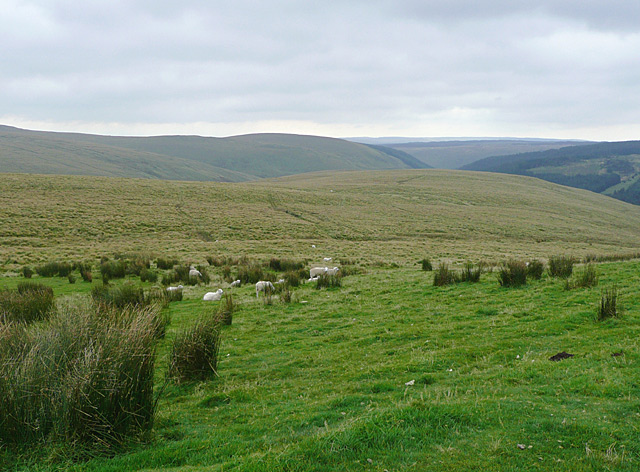
Elenydd landscape at Drum Nantygorlan

The Elenydd (Welsh: [ɛˈlɛnɨð]) is an upland area of Mid Wales, extending across parts of northern and eastern Ceredigion and Powys between Aberystwyth and Rhayader. Elenydd is also a name given to the medieval commote of Cwmwd Deuddwr which covered approximately the same area.

The area is an upland plateau of moorland and rough grazing within the Cambrian Mountains, source of the rivers Elan, Severn, Teifi, Towy and Wye. Elenydd is generally interpreted to mean the upland area between Pumlumon in the north and Mynydd Epynt in the south. The term "Desert of Wales" is sometimes applied to this or a wider area.

Much of Elenydd is open land with public access, following the Countryside and Rights of Way Act 2000, widely known as the "CROW Act". Specific areas within Elenydd are designated as being of nature conservation importance.

== Etymology ==
The name means the "area adjoining the Elan", which river name probably arises from Welsh elain, meaning fawn or hind; -ydd is a suffix denoting a territory.

== Geology ==
The hills and valleys of Elenydd are carved into a suite of mudstones and sandstones largely of Silurian age though some Ordovician strata is present locally within the core of the Rhiwnant Anticline which runs northeast–southwest through the southern Elenydd. Parallel to but northwest of this structure is the complex Central Wales Syncline.

Turbidite mudstones of the lower Silurian Cwmere Formation occur around Caban-coch and Carreg-ddu reservoirs. The Caban Conglomerate Formation forms such summits as Drygarn Fawr. To their north and west are the similar lithologies of the Derwenlas Formation which can be seen for example beside the dam of Claerwen Reservoir. The Rhayader Mudstones overlie these and are to be found further north and west again forming such summits as Esgair Penygarreg, Moelfryn and Craig Dyfnant. North and west of Craig Goch Reservoir are the Rhuddnant Grits (Formation), the Pysgotwr Grits (Formation) and the Glanyrafon Formation, each of which comprises both sandstones and mudstones. They give rise to the knolly country around Teifi Pools and to such summits as Esgair y Llwyn in the east.

There has been vein mineralisation within the area resulting in the development of the Central Wales Mining Field which centres on Cwmystwyth. Lead, zinc and silver have been the prime metals derived by mining these areas over centuries.

A legacy of the last ice age, there are extensive tracts of country covered by glacial till, particularly in many of the broader valleys. Similarly extensive spreads of peat have developed across parts of the plateau surface in the postglacial period. Some of the valleys are floored with alluvial deposits.

== Nature conservation designations ==
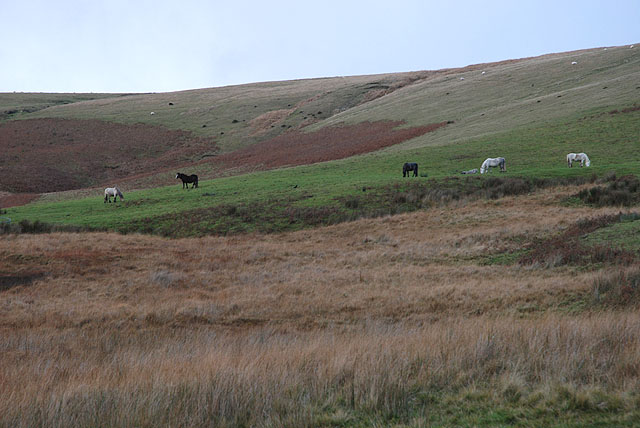
Wild ponies on the slopes of Esgair y Tŷ

=== Elenydd Site of Special Scientific Interest ===
Elenydd SSSI which covers an area of 22,770ha, is important both for its earth science and biological interest. The former include Silurian outcrops north of Caban Coch Dam and exposures and spoil tips at Cwmystwyth Mine, a key part of the Central Wales Mining Field. There are two glacial landforms dating from the late Pleistocene at Cwm Ddu and Cwm Tinwen and Holocene river landforms at Gors Lwyd where the shifting course of the Elan has left abandoned channels and river terraces.

The area's biological interest includes breeding birds and blanket bog. The mires at Cors Lwyd, Cors Goch and at the headwaters of the Elan and Claerwen are particularly interesting, supporting rare plants. Some of the mountain lakes are home to the internationally rare floating water-plantain.

Within the SSSI is the Nant Irfon National Nature Reserve which is owned and managed by Natural Resources Wales (NRW) and the Claerwen NNR which NRW manages in partnership with the site's owners, the Elan Valley Trust. The rest of the SSSI is owned by a mix of private and public landowners including Welsh Water, Wildlife Trust of South and West Wales, the Crown Estate and the National Trust.

=== Elenydd Special Area of Conservation ===
Elenydd SAC covers some 8609 ha within both Ceredigion and Powys designated for the same range of reasons as the SSSI.

=== Elenydd-Mallaen Special Protection Area ===
Elenydd-Mallaen SPA is a large upland site (30,022 ha) described by CCW as ‘one of the most important areas of hill land in Wales for nature conservation’. Breeding birds of importance include the red kite, peregrine falcon and merlin.

== See also ==
- List of Sites of Special Scientific Interest in Ceredigion
