= Banc Tynddol sun-disc =

Artefact found in Wales

Coordinates: 52°21′11″N 3°46′09″W

- Disc Haul Banc Tynddol
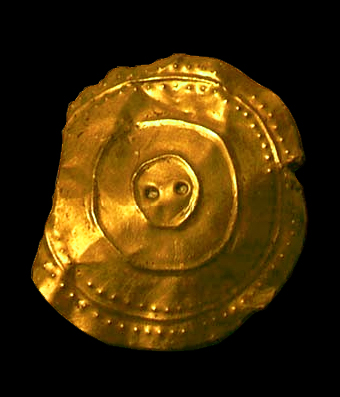
- Decorated with concentric line and dot circles and pierced by two central holes, apparently for attachment. The design was determined to belong to the Primary Bell Beaker Goldwork Tradition.
- Material: Gold
- Created: c. 2300 BC
- Discovered: 16 October 2002; Wales, United Kingdom
- Present location: Amgueddfa Cymru – National Museum Wales, Cardiff, Wales

The Banc Tynddol sun-disc (Welsh: Disc Haul Banc Tynddol) is a small, decorated, gold ornament discovered near Cwmystwyth, Ceredigion, Wales. It most likely was part of a funerary garment and is dated to 2450-2150 BCE, which makes it the earliest gold artifact found in Wales. It was discovered on 16 October 2002 by a team of archaeologists who were investigating the site of Roman and medieval lead smelting hearths below the Bronze Age copper mine on Copa Hill.

== History ==
The area around Cwmystwyth has been mined for lead and copper for more than 4,000 years, almost since the beginning of metalworking in Britain.

== Site excavation ==
Excavations have shown that these mining sites date to the Roman (first century AD) and Early Medieval (ninth to twelfth century AD) periods, but one of the most important finds of the excavation was the gold disc about the size of a milk-bottle top, which pre-dated these discoveries by more than 2,000 years.

At the time of its discovery, it seemed uncertain as to whether the gold object had ever been intentionally deposited; no earlier archaeological features were at that time identified, whilst its shallow find-spot suggested that it had been disturbed and re-deposited some distance downslope from its original burial context. However, the object was at that time identified and reported to HM Coroner for Ceredigion as a Treasure find on 30 October 2002, whilst further study of the find continued, and a follow-up investigation of the find spot was planned. Given concerns over the possibility of further artefacts remaining within the ground by virtue of association with the disc, also potential treasure, re-excavation of the site took place in March 2003, with funding from the National Museums and Galleries of Wales.

Samples of soil containing degraded bone fragments were collected for dating along with charcoal from in and around the grave. Insufficient collagen survived to provide any sort of reliable date from the bone, whilst the three samples of charcoal recovered from the grave fill proved to be intrusive; one suggesting Mesolithic activity associated with the pre-burial land surface (OxA-12983: 8850 ± 40 [8210–7760 CalBC]), another a Late Roman date for the ground surface covering the edge of the grave (OxA-12955: 1675 ± 28 [320–430 Cal AD]), whilst the third consisted of a single piece of oak charcoal derived from the Early Medieval smelting horizon above (OxA-12956: 1264 ± 27 [670–840 Cal AD]). Whilst not providing us with any clear answer, these results do at least support the possibility of a prehistoric burial.

Upon further investigation it was determined that the absence of identifiable skeletal remains and of only a thin film with insufficient collagen, precluded accurate Carbon-14 (C14) dating.

== Detailed description ==
The disc is 3.89 cm in diameter, with a weight of 2.51g, made of a very pure gold that is composed of around 93.5% gold, around 6.5% silver, and a negligible amount of copper. It is decorated with concentric line and dot circles and pierced by two central holes, apparently for attachment. The design was determined to belong to the Primary Bell Beaker Goldwork Tradition. Even though the exact source for the metal cannot be established, the composition appears consistent with that for Irish, Scottish, and Welsh alluvial gold. The disc was most likely made for a funerary garment and possibly, to symbolize the life-giving power of the sun. Further investigation of the discovery site revealed skeletal remains that once were covered over by a mound of stones, known as a cairn. The grave was located within a crescent of boulders and was oriented to look down the valley to the west—a poignant resting place for the person wearing one of Wales's first metal discs derived from native gold.

Similar artifacts have been found in Ireland, The Isle of Man, and Brittany. Most known examples of this class of 'sun-disc' have been found in Ireland (21), with smaller numbers from Scotland (6), England (5), and similar examples from France. This is the first example to be found in Wales and thought to be the earliest gold artifact from Wales, probably belonging to the slightly later established Beaker phase (c. 2000 BC). The Banc Ty'nddôl disc most closely resembles an example from Ireland that remains without provenance, having two-four linear circles in repoussé and two central perforations. A similar style with repoussé dots is to be found in an example from Kirk Andreas in The Isle of Man.

In Brittany, gold discs with similar dot and linear decoration have been discovered in Neolithic tombs and they also appear to be associated with early Beaker (Chalcolithic) abandonment deposits. In Britain, three examples have been found associated with two Beaker burials (one as a pair, and one as a single find) at Mere and Farleigh Wick in Wiltshire.

The similarities in style and decorative technique between the Banc Ty'nddôl disc and 'basket earrings' or gold hair tress ornaments associated with rich Beaker burials is striking. Examples from Kirkhaugh, Northumberland had been tooled similarly on the surface as a means of enhancing the repoussé lines applied to the back, a detail precisely matched on the Banc Ty'nddôl disc. The Kirkhaugh basket earring and other items from similar burial sites can all be dated to the period between 2500–1900 BC.

== Current status ==
The disc was declared a treasure in December 2003 and has since been acquired by the Amgueddfa Cymru – National Museum Wales.

== Gallery ==
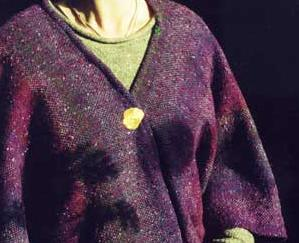
The disc being worn showing possible means of attachment to tunic or other garment.

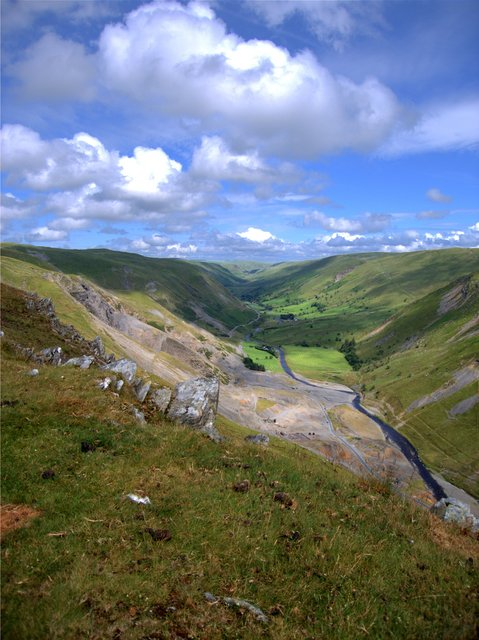
Cwmystwyth mines, located near the excavation site.

== Archaeologists ==
- Simon Timberlake: Excavations Director, Early Mines Research Group, Cambridge CB5 8ST, UK.
- Adam Gwilt: Later Prehistorian, Department of Archaeology, National Museum & Gallery of Wales, CF10 3NP, UK.
- Mary Davis: Archaeological Conservator, National Museum & Gallery of Wales, Cardiff CF10 3NP, UK.

== See also ==
- Archaeology of Wales
