= Pont-rhyd-y-groes =

Village in Ceredigion, Wales

Coordinates: 52.338163°N 3.849038°W

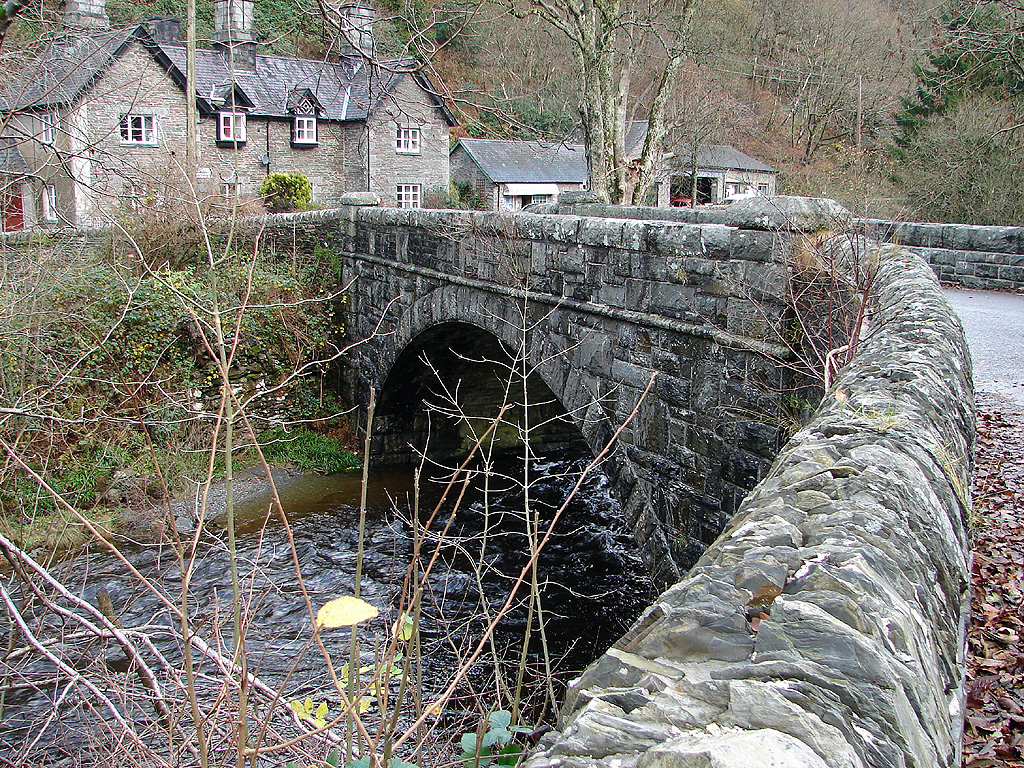
- Pont-rhyd-y-groes, the bridge over the Ystwyth.

- Location within Ceredigion
- OS grid reference: SN740727
  - Cardiff: 90 mi (140 km)SE
- Principal area: Ceredigion
- Preserved county: Dyfed
- Country: Wales
- Sovereign state: United Kingdom
- Post town: YSTRAD MEURIG
- Postcode district: SY25
- Dialling code: 01974
- Police: Dyfed-Powys
- Fire: Mid and West Wales
- Ambulance: Welsh
- UK Parliament: Ceredigion Preseli
- Senedd Cymru – Welsh Parliament: Ceredigion Penfro

Pont-rhyd-y-groes (also known as Pontrhydygroes, 'the bridge of the ford of the cross') is a village near Cwmystwyth and Devil's Bridge (Welsh: Pont ar Fynach), in Ceredigion, Wales. The village takes its name from the bridge (pont) and (earlier) ford (rhyd) over the River Ystwyth.

The area used to be dominated by the mining industry, in particular by the Lisburnes. The miners' bridge across the Ystwyth gorge and the waterfall have been rebuilt.

The remnants of the Fron Goch mines, which mined lead and zinc from ca. 1760 until ca. 1903, are situated approximately 1 3/4 miles (2 3/4 km) north of the village.

== Notable people ==
- Beth Robert, Welsh TV actress since 1986.
