= South Wales Miners' Museum =

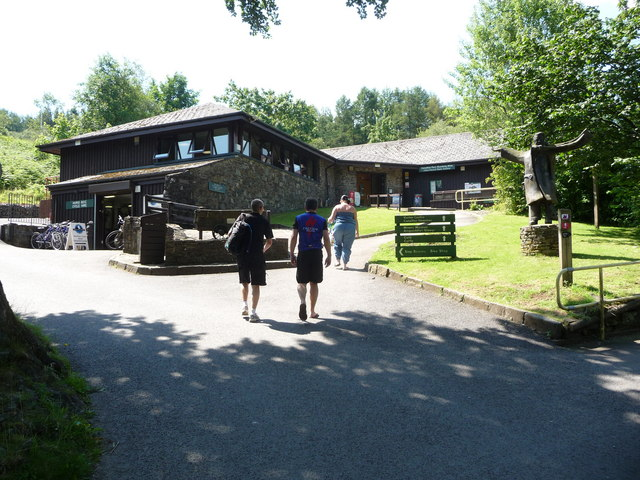
- Afan Forest Park Visitor Centre housing the South Wales Miners' Museum

- Museum location in Neath Port Talbot
- Established: 1976
- Location: Cynonville, Port Talbot, South Wales
- Coordinates: 51.6415°N 3.7032°W
- Type: Mining museum
- Parking: On site Pay and Display operated by Neath Port Talbot Council
- Website: South Wales Miners' Museum

The South Wales Miners' Museum is a museum of the coal mining industry and its workforce in the South Wales Coalfield. It is located at Cynonville within the Afan Forest Park Visitor Centre in the Afan Forest Park, near the small village of Cymmer in Neath Port Talbot.

== History ==
The museum, the first of its kind in Wales, opened in June 1976. The main features of the museum at that time included a traditional miner's cottage scene and display cabinets containing historical photographs and documents designed to reflect the industrial heritage of mining in Wales. In 1976, the museum received The Prince of Wales Award, and two years later it was highly placed in the National Heritage Museum of the Year Award. The museum was also highly commended by the British Tourist Authority in their "Come to Britain" competition. The museum receives a large number of visitors annually.

== Facilities and exhibitions ==
The museum, which re-opened in 2008 after rebuilding, features a recreation of a tunnel where models of children can be seen crawling through the space underground. There is also a realistic stable with a miner, his pit pony and trailer. Outdoor exhibits include a blacksmith's shop, a lamp room with Davy lamps, a pithead wheel, a haulage engine and coal dram.
