= Becca (film) =

- Directed by: Paul Turner
- Starring: Beth Robert
- Country of origin: Australia; United Kingdom
- Original languages: English; Welsh

Production
- Producers: Terry Ohlsson; Richard Meyrick
- Running time: 90 mins

Original release
- Network: ABC
- Release: 13 September 1989

Becca is a 1989 UK-Australian TV movie about a Welsh farmer who is transported to Australia in the 1840s. It was shot in English and Welsh. Beth Robert and Dafydd Hywel played the main characters.
