= Beth Robert =

Welsh television actress

- Born: Beth Robert; Pont-rhyd-y-groes, Ceredigion, Wales
- Education: Cardiff University
- Occupation: Actor
- Years active: 1986–present
- Spouse: Paul Harris (m. 2001)
- Children: 1

Beth Robert is a Welsh television actress from Pont-rhyd-y-groes, Wales, who has worked in television since 1986. Her appearances in TV series, in Welsh and English, include Hinterland, The Indian Doctor and Pobol y Cwm.

== Early and personal life ==
Robert comes from the village of Pont-rhyd-y-groes near Aberystwyth. She went on to study at the College of Music and Drama in Cardiff, and graduated in 1986.

Robert is married to Paul Harris. They met in Porthmadog in March 2000. They have one daughter together.

Her father died when she was in her early twenties.

== Career ==
Robert portrayed Lisa Morgan in the Welsh soap Pobol y Cwm for the first time in January 1990. In 1997, Lisa, Beth's character, was part of the first kiss between two women on Welsh television. Robert left the series again in 2000. After an absence of 19 years the actress returned to the series and was in numerous prominent storylines between 2019 and 2021.

Between 2005 and 2008 she starred as Judith in Con Passionate, before playing Myra in Teulu, a Welsh-language drama series that ran for five series.

Her English language roles include the Sky One comedy-drama Stella, and two series of Young Dracula on CBBC.

== Filmography ==
=== Television ===
Year	Title	Role	Notes
1986	Iar Fach Yr Haf		Television film
1987	Dihirod Dyfed	Bet Morgan	
1987	Dramarama	Sandra	Episode: A Spirited Performance
1988	Becca	Becca	Television film
1989–1991	We are Seven	Mary Morgan	2 series; 13 episodes
1990–1991, 1996–2000, 2019–2021	Pobol y Cwm	Lisa Morgan	Series regular
1991	C'mon Midffîld!	Deryth	Episode: Tibetans v Mowthwalians
1994	The Lifeboat	Dilys Gower	Series 1
1995	Inspector Morse	Garage Cashier	Episode: The Way Through the Woods
1996	Trip Trap	Dr. Pat Keenan	
1996	The Bill	Mrs Tyler	
1997	A Mind to Kill	Martha	Series 2; Head of the Valleys
1997	Drover's Gold	Mrs Edwards	
1997–2003	Iechyd Da	Carys	
2002	A Mind to Kill	Shelley Hartson	Series 4; Engineer
2003	Hearts of Gold	Sister Jackson	
2004	Casualty	Beth Marsden	Episode: No Weddings and a Funeral
2005–2008	Con Passionate	Judith Evans	3 series
2005	Eye on...Blatchford	Ice Cream Child	
2006–2008	Young Dracula	Elizabeth Branaugh	Series 1–2
2007	Belonging	Wendy Duckett	
2008	S.O.S Galw Gari Tryfan	Julia	
2008–2013	Teulu	Myra	
2008	Rhestr Nadolig Wil	Gwerfyl	
2009	Ar y Tracs	Mrs Parri-Adams Hughes-Lloyd	
2010	The Indian Doctor	Sylvia Sharpe	Series 1
2011	Made in Wales	Mum	Episode: Tentboy
2012–2013	Stella	Mrs Barclay	Series 1–2
2013	Hinterland	Gwyneth James	Episode: Penwyllt
2014	Pryd o Sêr	Participant	
2014	35 Diwrnod	Sali Jenkins	Series 1
2015	Lan a Lawr	Delia	2 series
2016–2018	Parch	Sheridan	Series 2–3
2017	Keeping Faith	Rhona	Series 1
2018	Hidden	Carol Reed	Series 1
