= Garw/Ffaldau Colliery =

Welsh coal mine active in the 20th century

Coordinates: 51.6122°N 3.5851°W

The Garw/Ffaldau Colliery was a colliery formed in 1975 in Pontycymer, Wales. It was formed from the joining together of the Garw Colliery and the Ffaldau Colliery. The Ffaldau Colliery had 1,100 workers in 1927, though this had declined by half by the mid 1930s.

The pit closed in November 1985; a total of 630 miners lost their jobs. A potential buy out of the pit by workers had been mooted, but this was deemed to have been prohibitively expensive after the National Coal Board cut the ropes on the caged lift and 200,000 tonnes of hardcore were poured down the mine shaft. A reunion was held of former mine workers in 2015.

The Garw Colliery (also known as the Ocean Colliery) was one of six pits in the Garw valley. Following the merger of the two pits workers entering at Blaengarw had a 1–2 mile walk underground due to the closure of the access shaft at Pontycymer.
