= River Ystwyth =

River in Wales

Coordinates: 52°19′50″N 3°53′47″W

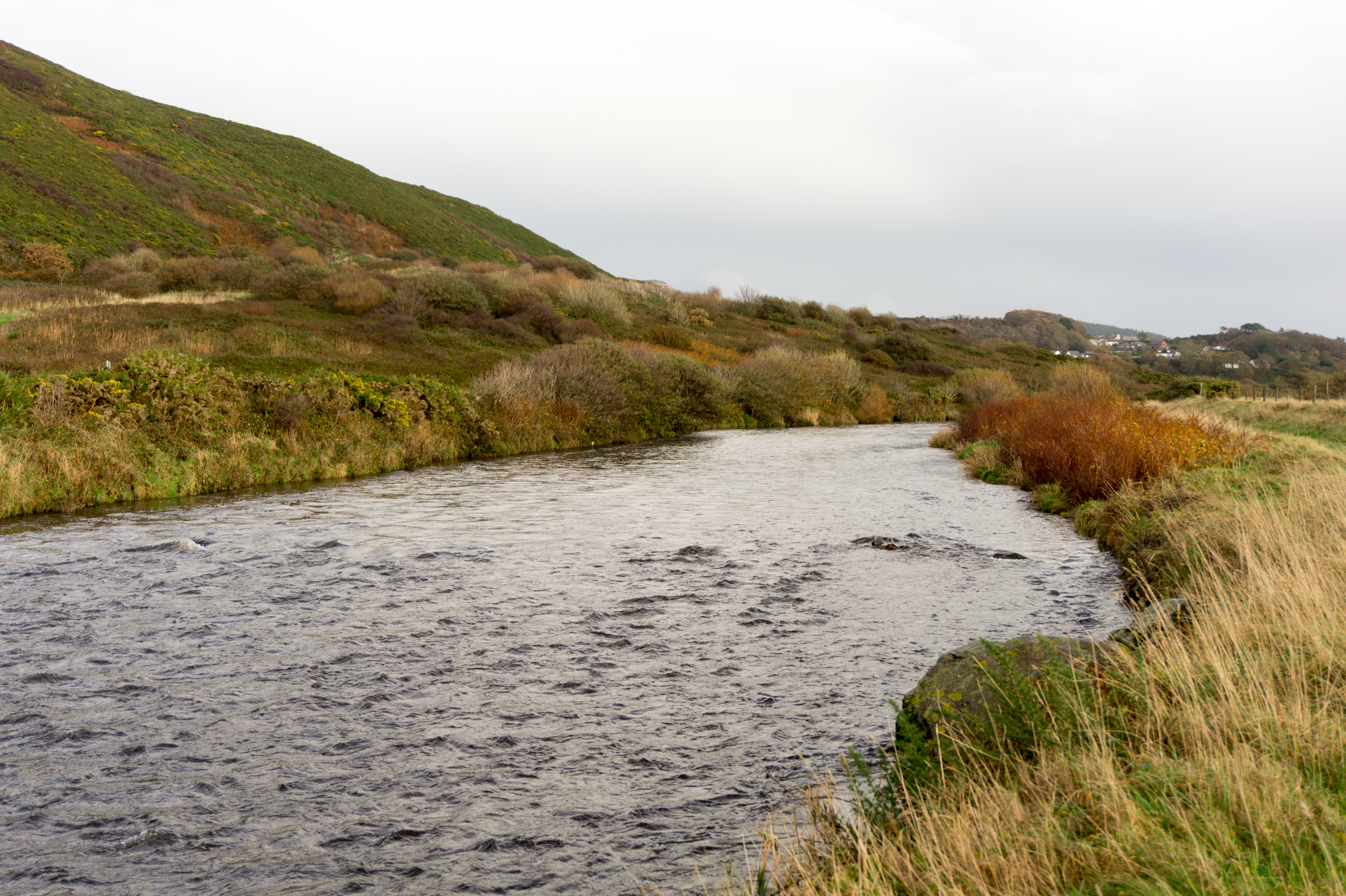
- River Ystwyth near Trawsgoed

Location
- Country: Wales
- Region: Ceredigion

Physical characteristics
- Source: Carnbwlchcloddiau, Elenydd, Powys, Wales
  - elevation: 500 m (1,600 ft)
- Mouth
  - location: Cardigan Bay, Aberystwyth, Ceredigion
- Length: 20.5 mi (33.0 km)

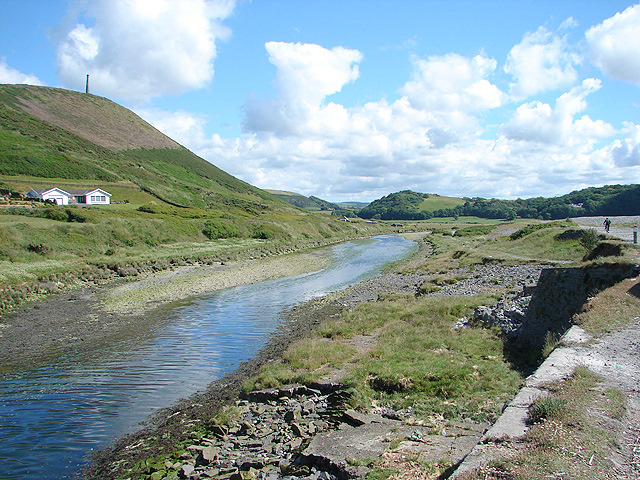
The Ystwyth looking upstream from its confluence with the Rheidol just before their combined estuary. On the left is Pendinas Hill and on the right is Tanybwlch Beach

The River Ystwyth (Welsh: Afon Ystwyth; [ˈəstʊɨ̯θ]; lit. 'winding river') is a river in Ceredigion, Wales. The length of the main river is 20.5 miles (33.0 km). Its catchment area covers 75 square miles (190 km^{2}). Its source is a number of streams that include the Afon Diliw, located on the west slopes of Plynlimon on the border of Ceredigion and Powys in the Cambrian Mountains. The Ystwyth flows westwards into the harbour at Aberystwyth to drain into Cardigan Bay.

The Ystwyth valley is sparsely populated with villages, namely Ysbyty Ystwyth, Cwm Ystwyth, Pont-rhyd-y-groes, Llanilar and Llanfarian. In previous centuries, the valley was relatively densely populated due to its mineral wealth. Silver, lead and zinc have been mined in the valley since Roman times, an activity that reached its peak in the 18th century. The largest of the very many mines was Cwm Ystwyth Mine. It is reputed that the average age at death of the miners in Cwm Ystwyth was 32, largely because of acute lead poisoning. There is no active metal mining in the Ystwyth valley today.

Hafod Uchtryd was a mansion built by Thomas Johnes from 1783, part of it being designed by John Nash. The landscaped gardens were formed by blasting away parts of hills to create vistas. Roadways and bridges were built, and hundreds of thousands of trees were planted. The result was a landscape that became famous and attracted many visitors, including Samuel Taylor Coleridge, and it is believed to have inspired a passage in his poem Kubla Khan. The house was demolished in 1955, but the landscape remains today.

The River still carries elevated levels of lead, zinc, and silver in its water, mostly due to seepage from abandoned mine tailings and discharges from mine adits. At the Frongoch mine near Pont-rhyd-y-groes, Natural Resources Wales has introduced a new technique for reducing the pollution. Water is drawn away from the mine in a leat to a wetland area, where biological processes involving the vegetation immobilise much of the pollutants. A similar approach is being used at Cwm Rheidol mine, near Aberystwyth. These remedies are considered important because the area supports a rich variety of wildlife, as well as bringing anglers and tourists to the area.
