= Cwmystwyth Mines =

Lead and silver mines in Ceredigion, Wales

Coordinates: 52.355299°N 3.769283°W

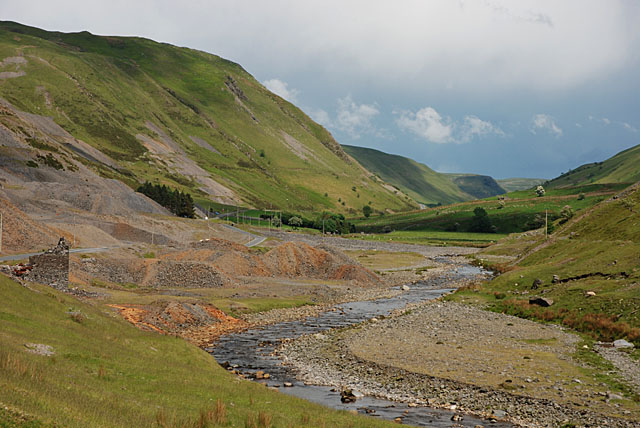
Cwm Ystwyth mine scape, present day

Cwmystwyth mines are located in Cwmystwyth, Ceredigion, Wales and exploited a part of the Central Wales Orefield.

Cwm Ystwyth is a scheduled monument, with mining activity dating back to the Bronze Age. Silver, lead, and zinc mining peaked in the 18th century, and water was extensively used in the extraction process. The Banc Ty'nddôl, the earliest gold artifact discovered in Wales, was found on the site in 2002. Mining in the area caused substantial environmental impact; lead concentrations in the River Ystwyth declined from 0.4 mg/L in 1919 to below 0.05 mg/L in 1939, with fish populations returning to most of the river by 1975.

== Mining heritage ==
Cwm Ystwyth is considered the most important non-ferrous metal mining site in Wales, providing a premier example of mining heritage in Ceredigion. Within the site is evidence for all phases of mining activity; from the Bronze Age, through the medieval period, to its revival in the 18th century and the peak of activity, with a subsequent decline in the late 19th and the early 20th century. It has been designated as a Scheduled Ancient Monument. The site also features prominently in the Upland Ceredigion Landscape of Historic Interest.

== History ==
Silver, lead and zinc have been mined in the valley of the River Ystwyth since Roman times, an activity that reached its peak in the 18th century. The largest of the very many mines was Cwmystwyth Mine. It is reputed that the average age at death of the miners in Cwmystwyth was 32, largely because of acute lead poisoning. There is no longer any active metal mining in the Ystwyth valley.

== Water use ==
Water was extensively used during the silver and lead mining process to extract the ore. In the case of Cwm Ystwyth mine, much of the water was brought in by contour hugging leats from several miles upstream. The channel of the leat can still be followed on the hillside and is clearly visible from the road on the opposite side of the valley. Much of the water was used for hushing, prospecting and working the ore in the open.

== Banc Ty'nddôl sun-disc ==
In October 2002, the Banc Ty'nddôl sun-disc was discovered on the mining site. The disc is over 4,000 years old, which makes it the earliest gold artifact discovered in Wales.

== Environmental Impacts ==
A survey of the River Ystwyth in 1919 showed that due to mining activity in the area, the fauna was restricted to nine species, mostly of insects. The lead concentration in the river was found to be 0.4 mg/L. In 1922, another survey was conducted; the number of species had increased to 26, with the lead concentration decreasing to below 0.1 mg/L. The number of species increased to 63 by 1939, but there were still no fish present in the river. The lead concentration fell to below 0.05 mg/L. Fish had returned to most of the river by 1975. However, there were no fish within a 3 km stretch below the Cwm Ystwyth mine.

== Gallery ==
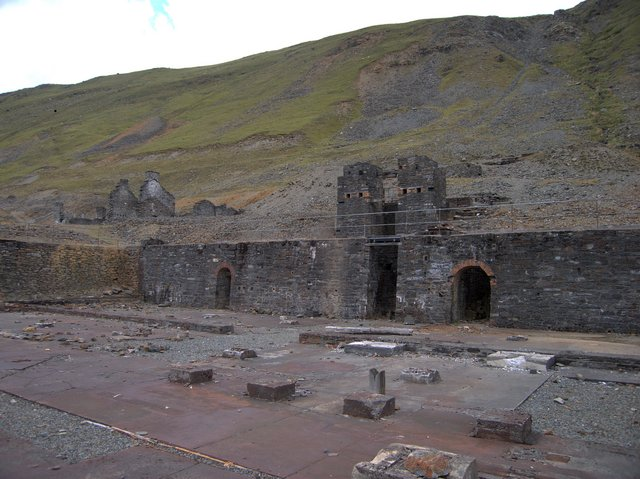
Main building of Cwmystwyth lead mine

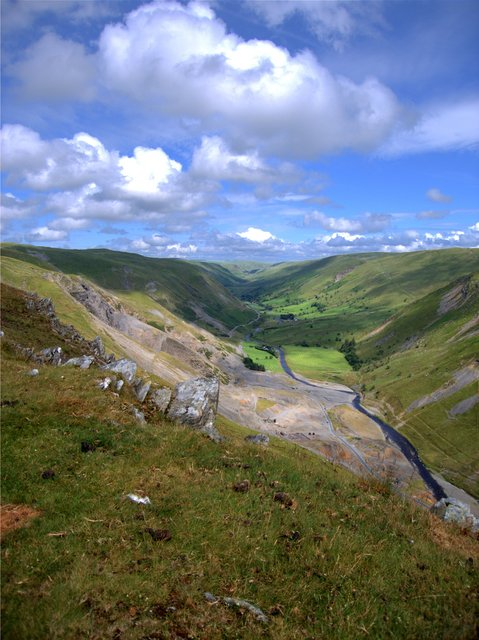
Graig y Ddalfa at Cwmystwyth lead mines

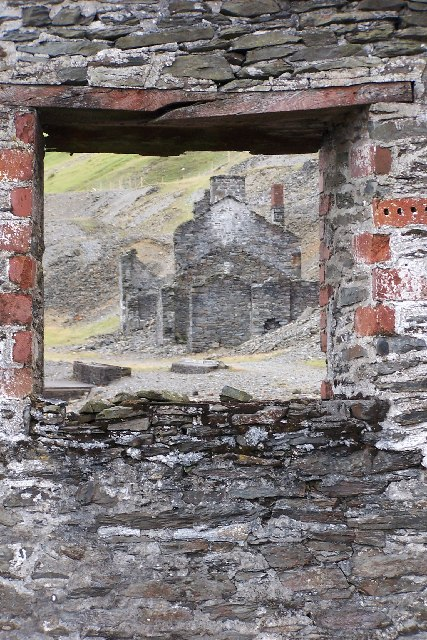
Old mine workings below Craig-y-Ddolfa, east of Cwmystwyth

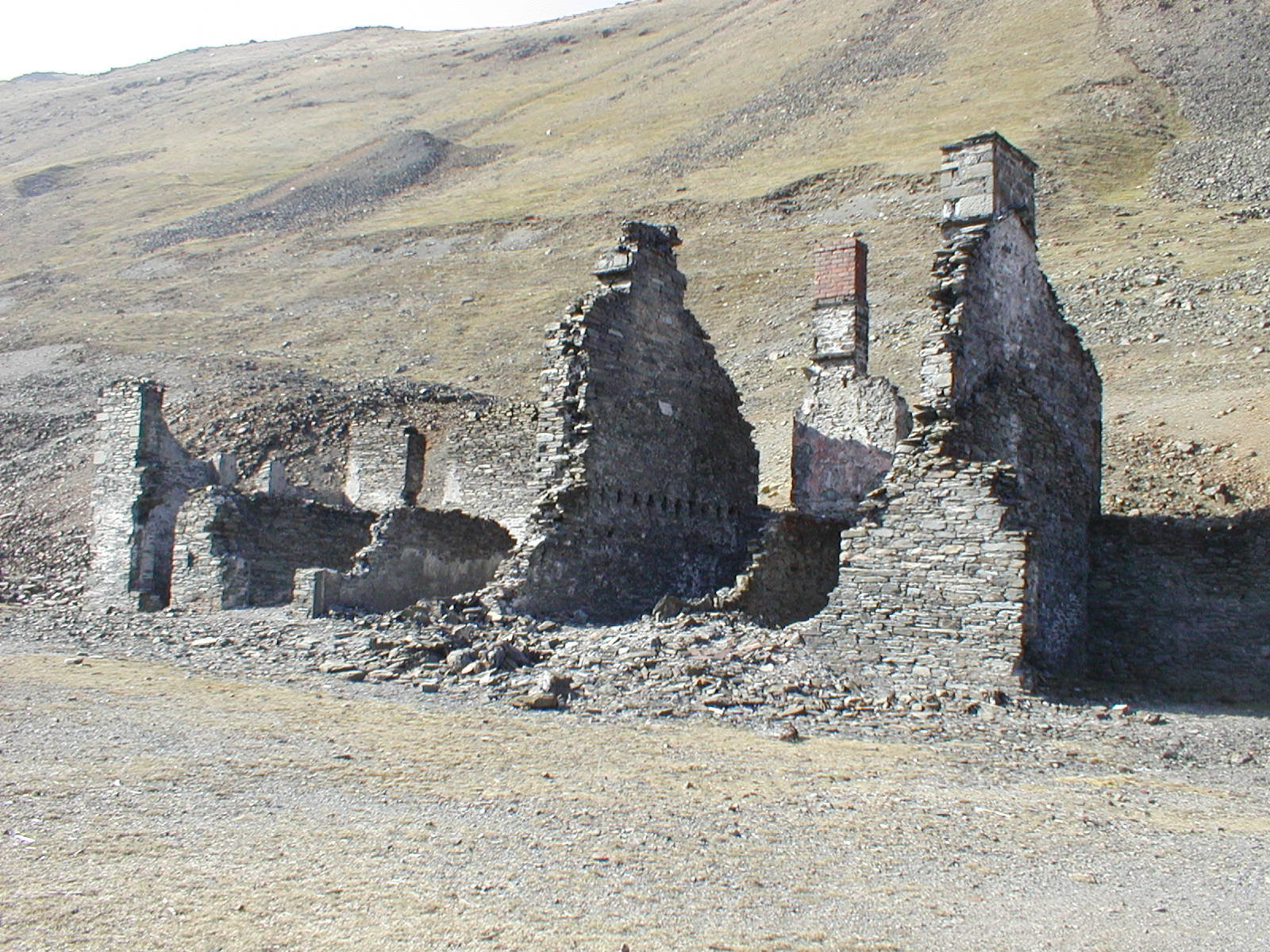
Abandoned building, old lead mine, Cwmystwyth.

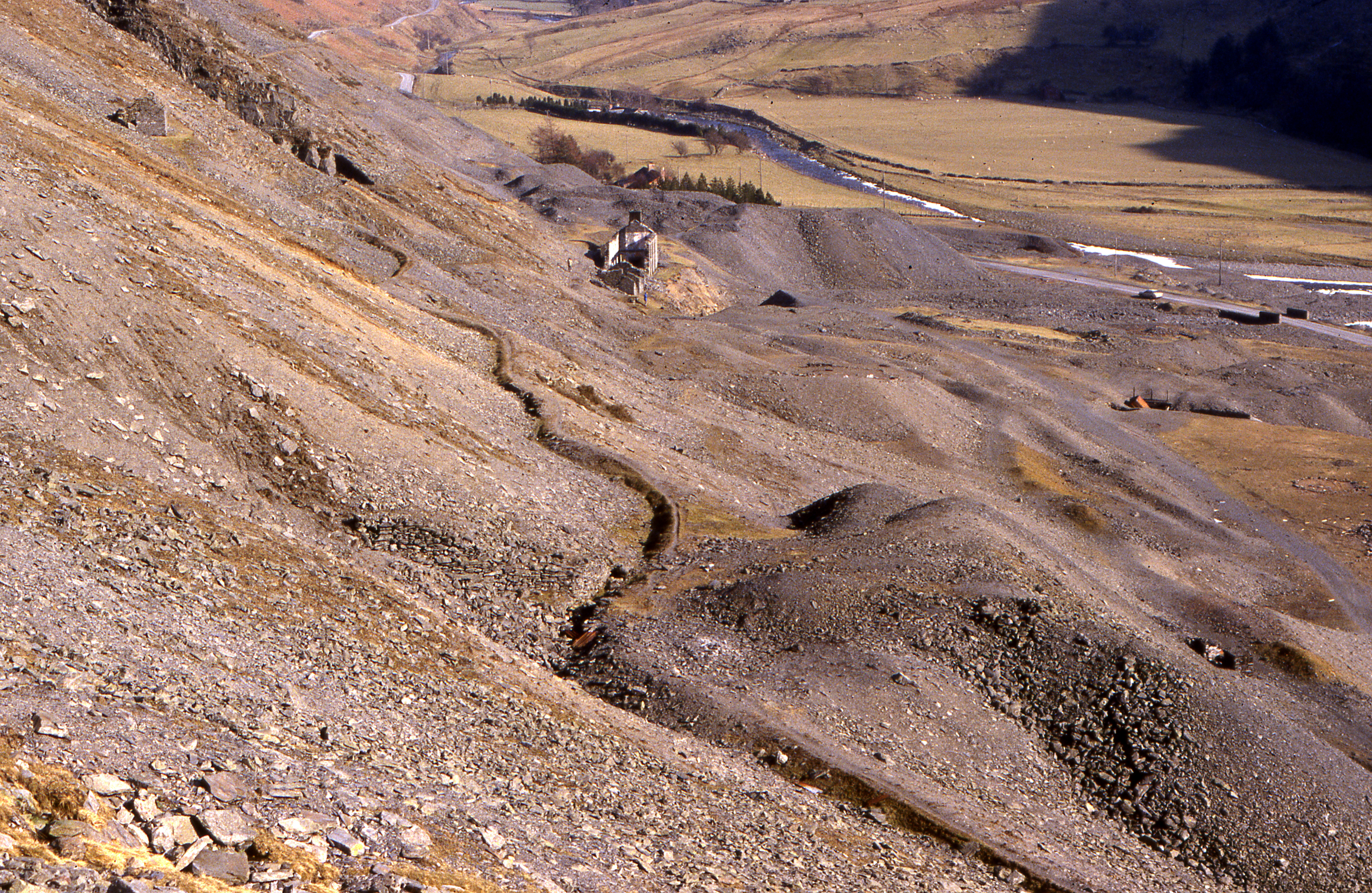
View of the mine workings with one of the many leats in the foreground

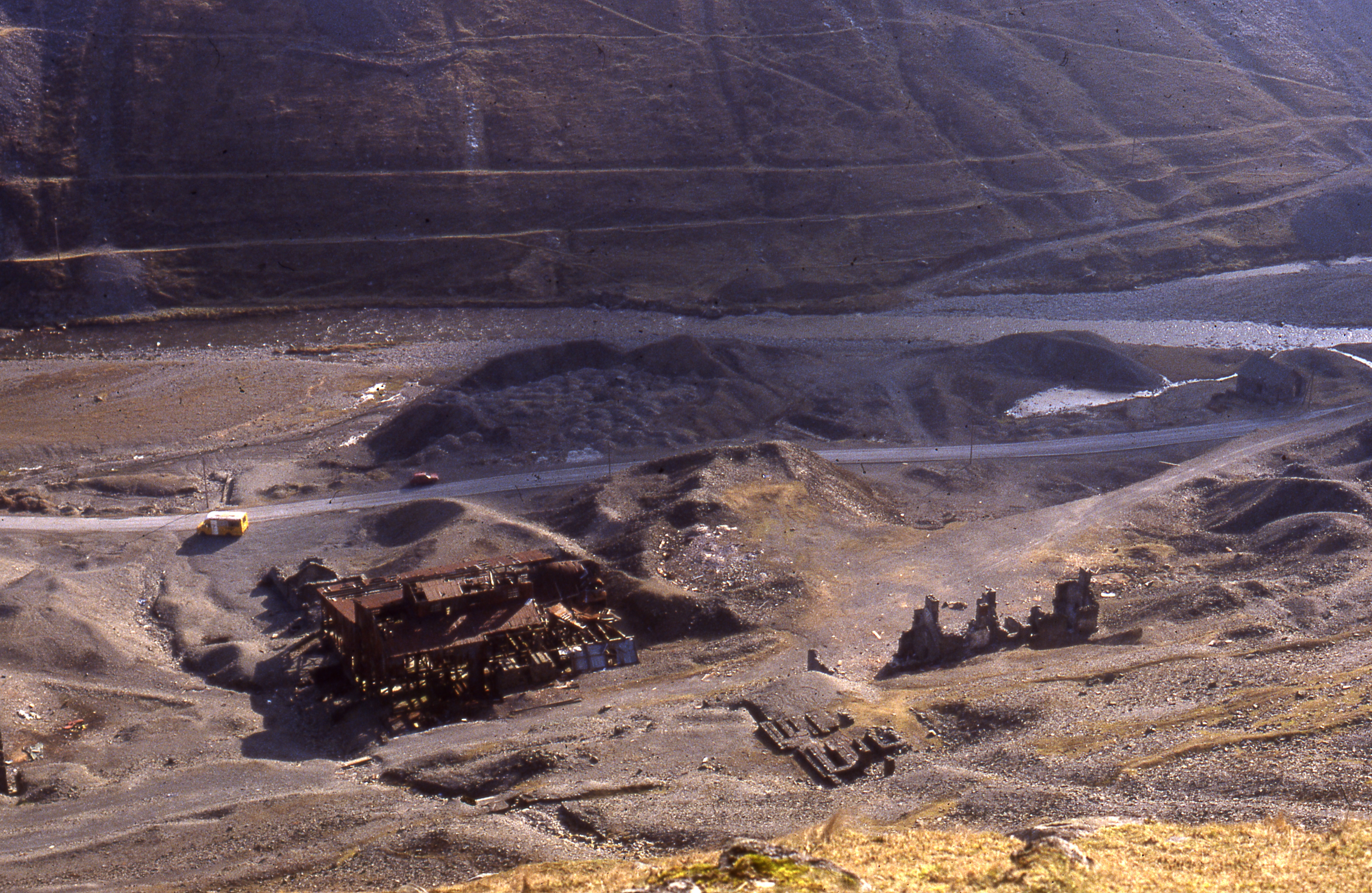
Cwmystwyth Mine from the hill-side immediately above the mine. Winter in 1985 when many buildings were still standing
