= Sygun Copper Mine =

Copper mine and mining museum in Wales

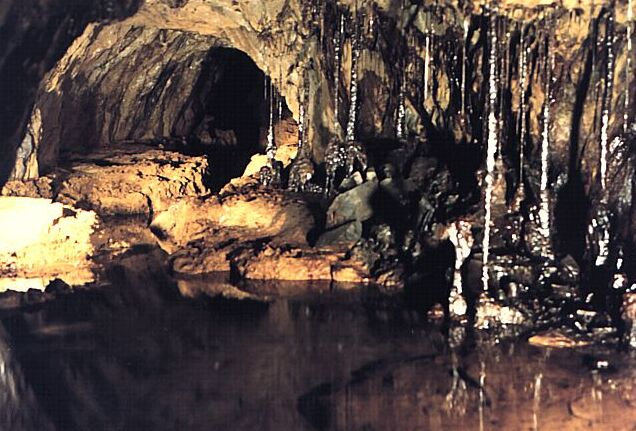
- Inside Sygun Copper Mine
- Interactive map of Sygun Copper Mine
- Location: Beddgelert, Snowdonia, , Wales; 53°01′06″N 4°04′52″W
- Products: Copper
- Active: From: 18th Century to 1903; Reopened: 1986 as tourist attraction
- Website: official website

Sygun Copper Mine is a Victorian copper mine which closed in 1903 but was renovated and reopened by the Amies family as a tourist attraction in 1986, focusing on audio-visual tours of the underground workings. Sygun Copper Mine was once a main supplier of minerals in Wales. It is located about one mile (1.6 km) outside of the village of Beddgelert in the Snowdonia National Park in North Wales.

== History ==
Mining in the area started in Roman times, with small-scale tunnels into mineral veins. These were left relatively untouched until the Industrial Revolution when the tunnels were dug deeper into the hills largely due to rising demand for copper. In 1836 the annual production of ore was valued at £2,800. By 1862 2,000 to 3,000 tons of ore had been extracted from the mine.

In 1898 the flotation process, using a mixture of oil and water to extract minerals, was developed by the Elmore brothers, Frank and Stanley, who owned the mine with their father. This was to increase the rate of extraction of copper from the ore. In 1903 the mine was shut down as further working would be unprofitable as the veins had been largely exhausted.

The entrance to the mine was reopened in 1983 and restoration work began in autumn 1986. In restoration, hundreds of tons of rubble were removed from the abandoned mine and access was improved.

In 2002 the mine and its subsidiaries were put up for sale on the retirement of the original developers.

== Awards ==
The Amies family was awarded the Prince of Wales Award in 1988 for "the sensitive development of visitor facilities at Sygun Copper Mine" in 1988. The award was presented to the family by Prince Charles during an award ceremony, where an ingot of copper produced from local ore was gifted to him. The copper mine is now owned and managed by the Ward Family who have refurbished all aspects of the mine and its visitor attractions.

== Attractions ==
The Sygun complex also includes an art museum and art gallery. The Sygun Museum of Wales also includes a Welsh mythology and Welsh history section, the Red Dragon Heritage Centre. The museum has one of the largest art collections of any privately controlled museum in Great Britain, small portions being exhibited at various times throughout the year. The collection is split into two main departments, antique and 20th century.

== Popular culture ==
The copper mine's original buildings, some of which still exist, were shown in the 1958 film The Inn of the Sixth Happiness.

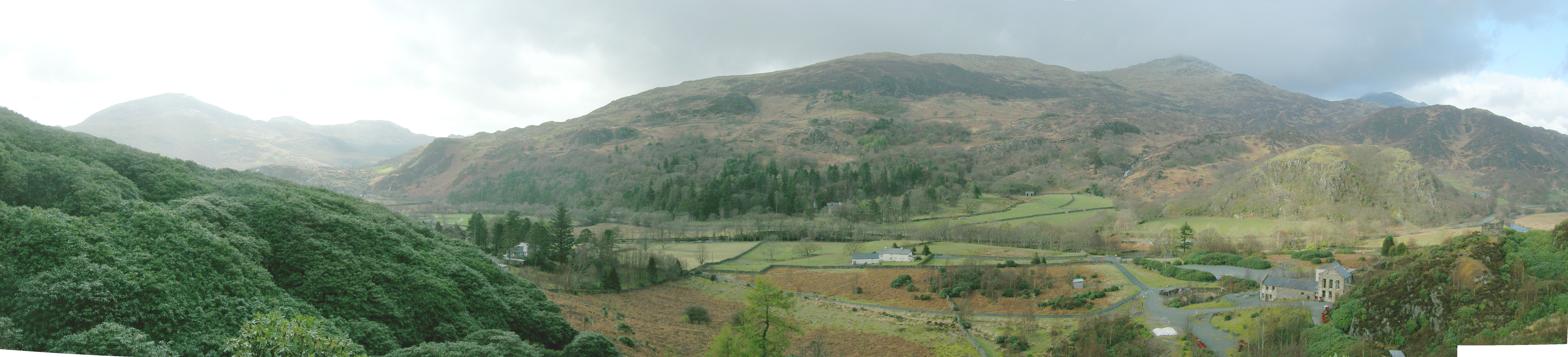
View from the exit of the copper mine
