= Cwmystwyth =

Village in Ceredigion, Wales

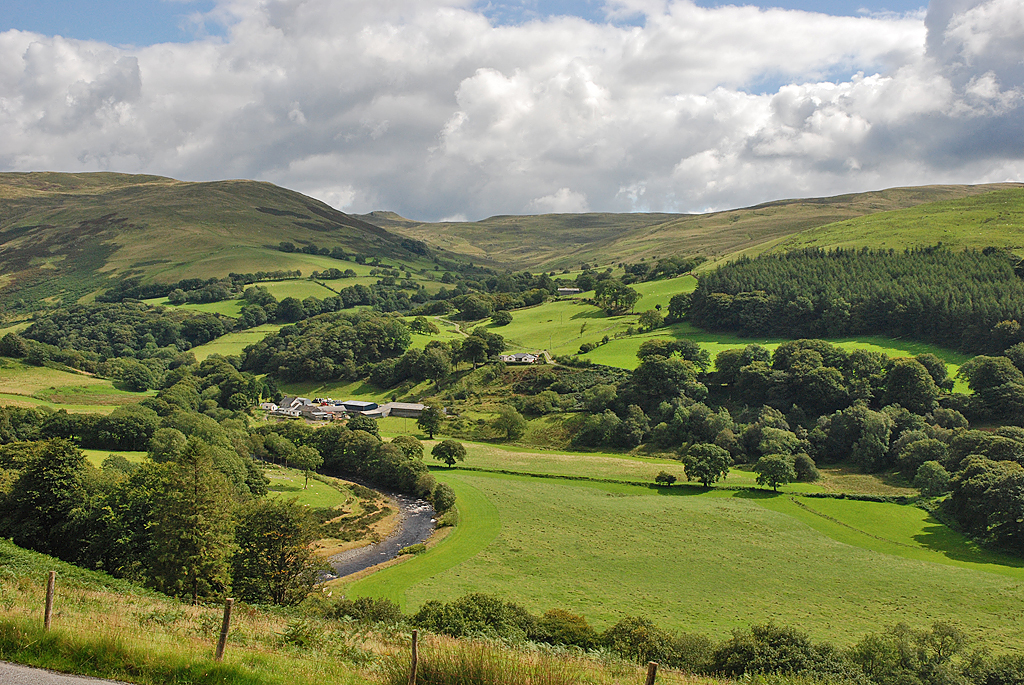
- A view towards Cwmystwyth, looking south-east

- Location within Ceredigion
- OS grid reference: SN789740
  - Cardiff: 90 mi (140 km)SE
- Principal area: Ceredigion
- Preserved county: Dyfed
- Country: Wales
- Sovereign state: United Kingdom
- Post town: Aberystwyth
- Postcode district: SY23
- Dialling code: 01974
- Police: Dyfed-Powys
- Fire: Mid and West Wales
- Ambulance: Welsh
- UK Parliament: Ceredigion Preseli
- Senedd Cymru – Welsh Parliament: Ceredigion Penfro

Cwmystwyth (also Cwm Ystwyth, Welsh pronunciation: [kʊmˈəstʊɨθ]; English: "valley of the River Ystwyth") is a village in Ceredigion, Wales near Devil's Bridge, and Pont-rhyd-y-groes.

The Ordnance Survey calculates Cwmystwyth to be the centre point of Wales (52°19′48.791″N 3°45′59.072″W; grid reference SN7972871704).

== History ==
Discovery of small, oval-shaped stone tools in the area points to the fact that it has been mined for lead since the time of ancient Britons and during Roman occupation. Documentation of mining activities occurred during the reign of Elizabeth I. She engaged the services of two German miners, then went on to sub-let to Hugh Myddleton.

The only significant flat area of the cwm is found before the river reaches maturity near Trawsgoed some 6 miles (9.7 km) further west. Above the village to the east steep slopes rise to the Elenydd moors, above the cwm of the Nant Milwyn, at the head of the hill of Domen Milwyn.

== Climate ==
Cwmystwyth experiences an oceanic climate (Köppen climate classification Cfb) similar to almost all of Wales and the United Kingdom. This translates to a narrow range of temperatures, rainfall in all seasons and low sunshine levels, particularly at upland locations such as inland Wales.

The Met Office maintains a weather station in the village, with online climate records dating back to 1959. Temperatures range from an absolute high of 32.3 °C (90.1 °F) recorded during July 2006, down to an absolute low of −16.7 °C (1.9 °F), recorded during January 1963. During an 'average' year, the warmest day will likely reach 26.1 °C (79.0 °F) and the coldest night fall to −8.0 °C (17.6 °F). In total just over 3 days should record a temperature of 25.1 °C (77.2 °F) or above, and 53.5 nights should report an air frost.

Rainfall, as one might expect for an elevated place in Wales, is high, at nearly 2,000 millimetres (79 in) a year. At least 1 millimetre (0.039 in) will be observed on 196 days of the year, on average. All averages refer to the period 1991–2020.

Climate data for Cwmystwyth: 301 m (988 ft) 1991–2020 normals, extremes 1959-2011
Month	Jan	Feb	Mar	Apr	May	Jun	Jul	Aug	Sep	Oct	Nov	Dec	Year
Record high °C (°F)	15.1 (59.2)	16.5 (61.7)	20.6 (69.1)	23.8 (74.8)	25.0 (77.0)	29.6 (85.3)	32.3 (90.1)	30.4 (86.7)	27.8 (82.0)	23.8 (74.8)	18.7 (65.7)	13.3 (55.9)	32.3 (90.1)
Mean daily maximum °C (°F)	6.5 (43.7)	6.8 (44.2)	8.8 (47.8)	11.6 (52.9)	14.6 (58.3)	17.0 (62.6)	18.4 (65.1)	18.1 (64.6)	16.2 (61.2)	12.7 (54.9)	9.3 (48.7)	7.2 (45.0)	12.3 (54.1)
Daily mean °C (°F)	3.9 (39.0)	4.0 (39.2)	5.4 (41.7)	7.6 (45.7)	10.3 (50.5)	12.8 (55.0)	14.6 (58.3)	14.3 (57.7)	12.4 (54.3)	9.6 (49.3)	6.5 (43.7)	4.5 (40.1)	8.8 (47.9)
Mean daily minimum °C (°F)	1.2 (34.2)	1.2 (34.2)	2.1 (35.8)	3.5 (38.3)	6.0 (42.8)	8.7 (47.7)	10.8 (51.4)	10.5 (50.9)	8.7 (47.7)	6.5 (43.7)	3.7 (38.7)	1.8 (35.2)	5.4 (41.7)
Record low °C (°F)	−16.7 (1.9)	−13.3 (8.1)	−13.9 (7.0)	−6.6 (20.1)	−3.5 (25.7)	−2.2 (28.0)	0.6 (33.1)	0.5 (32.9)	−3.0 (26.6)	−3.9 (25.0)	−10.7 (12.7)	−11.5 (11.3)	−16.7 (1.9)
Average precipitation mm (inches)	188.8 (7.43)	155.0 (6.10)	134.2 (5.28)	103.6 (4.08)	106.4 (4.19)	120.0 (4.72)	136.5 (5.37)	135.1 (5.32)	146.7 (5.78)	192.0 (7.56)	211.9 (8.34)	215.5 (8.48)	1,845.6 (72.66)
Average precipitation days (≥ 1.0 mm)	18.8	16.1	15.5	14.2	13.6	13.6	15.7	16.3	15.0	17.6	19.8	19.8	196.0
Mean monthly sunshine hours	34.2	59.2	94.3	141.4	173.6	154.6	147.7	136.1	115.0	83.1	45.0	28.8	1,213.1
Source 1: Met Office
Source 2: Starlings Roost Weather
