= Central Wales Orefield =

Ore mining zone in mid Wales

The Central Wales Orefield (also referred to as the Central Wales Mining District, Central Wales Mining Field and the Mid Wales Mining District) is an area of Mid Wales within which various metalliferous ores are present in the local rock strata and which were worked principally for the production of lead and zinc over many centuries. Roman activity is attested with mining continuing intermittently into the early twentieth century. The large Cwmystwyth Mine operated until 1923 and the Esgair Mwyn Mine extracted ore until 1927.

The main area of workings extended east from Aberystwyth towards Llanidloes and involved the extraction of ore containing lead, zinc, silver, copper, arsenic and barium. Some mineralisation and consequent mining activity is recorded as far south as the Llandovery area, the majority of the lodes being developed along ENE-WSW oriented fault lines. The lead-zinc mineralisation appears to have been associated with a phase of the Caledonian Orogeny and affects Silurian and, to a lesser extent, Ordovician rocks in the area.
