= Llanafan =

Llanafan (Welsh for "St Afan's parish") may refer to any of:

- Llanafan, Ceredigion, a village in Ceredigion
- Llanafan Fawr, a community and parish in Powys
- Llanafan Fechan or Llanfechan, a village and church in Powys
- Llanafan y Trawsgoed, the parish around the village in Ceredigion
