= Ernest Vaughan =

Ernest Vaughan may refer to:

- Ernest Vaughan, 4th Earl of Lisburne (1800–1873), landowner in Wales and member of parliament
- Ernest Augustus Malet Vaughan, 5th Earl of Lisburne (1836–1888), landowner in Wales
- Ernest Vaughan, 7th Earl of Lisburne (1892–1965), Welsh nobleman
