= Saint Afan =

6th-century Welsh saint

Saint Afan of Builth
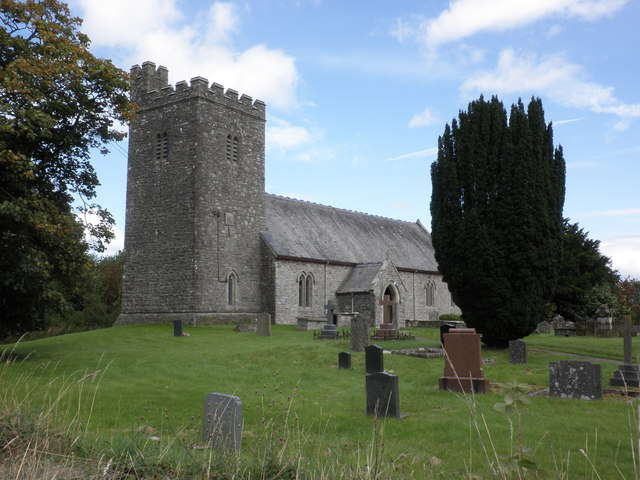
- St Afan's Church in Llanafan Fawr

Bishop
- Born: 5th or 6th century
- Died: 6th century Llanafan Fawr
- Canonized: Pre-Congregation
- Major shrine: Llanafan Fawr; Llanafan
- Feast: 16 or 17 November (lapsed)
- Patronage: Llanafan Fawr; Llanafan

Afan of Builth (Welsh: Sant Afan Buellt; Latin: Avanus) was an early 6th-century Welsh bishop, martyr, and saint. His feast day is generally placed on 17 November, although the Demetian Calendar formerly used in southern Wales placed it on the 16th; it is no longer observed by either the Anglican or Catholic church in Wales.

== Name ==
Afan as a man's name in Wales is probably a loan from the Latin Amandus. In Welsh, he is sometimes known as Esgob Afan ("Bishop Afan") from his title and as Afan Buellt or Buallt from his diocese around Builth in Brycheiniog.

== Life ==
Afan was the son of Cedig ap Ceredig, son of Cunedda Wledig, king of Gwynedd. (Note: He is sometimes also erroneously given as a son of Ceredig himself.) Through this line, he was a cousin of David, patron saint of Wales. Afan's mother is variously given as Dwywai, Degfed ("Tenth"), Tegfedd, or Tegwedd, all said to have been daughters of Tegid the Bald, a lord of Penllyn in Meirionnydd who was the husband of the sorceress Ceridwen in Welsh legend.

Afan was the founder of a Llanafan in Ceredigion and two others (Llanafan Fawr and Llanafan Fechan) in Brecknockshire. He is recorded as a bishop, although his diocese remains unknown. He may have been the third bishop of Llanbadarn in Ceredigion, bishop over Builth with his seat at Llanafan Fawr, or held the title without any purview beyond his own parish. His death was credited to martyrdom at the hand of Irish or Danish pirates on the banks of the River Chwefru. He was claimed as an ancestor of the 10th-century bishop Ieuan who was also martyred by Viking marauders.

== Miracles ==
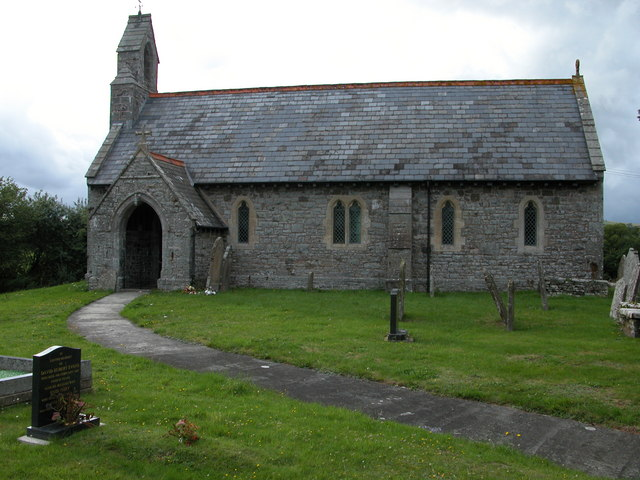
St Afan's Church at Llanfechan.

A miracle recounted by Gerald of Wales claimed that the Anglo-Norman lord Philip de Braose was struck blind and saw his hunting dogs go mad when he disrespectfully used St Afan's church in Brecknockshire as a makeshift hostel one night. (Note: "At this point I must tell you what happened, in the reign of Henry I, King of the English, to the castellan of Radnor castle, in the territory of Builth, which is not far away, being adjacent to his own lands, which he himself conquered. He had gone into the church of Saint Afan, called Llanafan in Welsh, and there he had spent the night with his dogs, which was a foolish and irreverent thing to do. He got up at first light, as hunters are wont to do, but he found that all his dogs had gone mad and that he himself was blind. He had lost his sight completely and he had to grope his way out with his hand...") He was told that his vision would only return if he resolved to leave his estates and fight in the Crusades. Some say his sight was restored upon his pledge but Gerald records that he traveled to the Holy Land and fought blind, where he was "immediately struck down by a blow from a sword and so ended his life with honour".

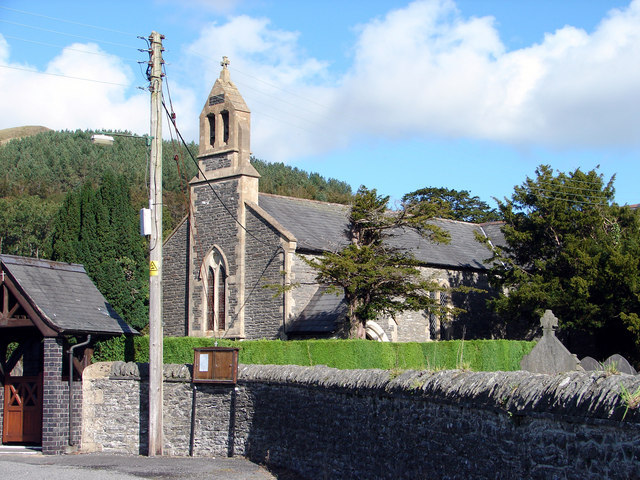
Capel Afan in Ceredigion.

== Legacy ==
Afan was said to have founded the parish of Llanafan in Ceredigion (now Llanafan y Trawsgoed), whose present church serves as the chapel for the village of Llanafan and the nearby Trawsgoed Estate. Its grounds house the family crypt of the earls of Lisburne.

Two churches were dedicated to him in the deanery of Builth: Llanafan Fawr ("Great Llanafan") and Llanafan Fechan or Fach ("Lesser Llanafan"), which eventually became known as Llanfechan. His relics are claimed by Llanafan Fawr, which served as a pilgrimage site during the Middle Ages. Afan's grave in the churchyard there is inscribed hic iacet sanctus avanus episcopus ("Here lies Saint Avan, bishop") in deeply cut, slightly ornamented Lombardic script. The present tomb, however, is not older than the late 13th century.

Browne Willis also considered the "Saint Afran" honored at Llantrisant on Anglesey to be a corruption of Afan.

== See also ==
- List of Welsh saints
