= Ernest Vaughan, 7th Earl of Lisburne =

Welsh nobleman

The Right Honourable The Earl of Lisburne
- Predecessor: George Vaughan, 6th Earl of Lisburne
- Successor: John David Malet Vaughan, 8th Earl of Lisburne
- Other titles: 10th Lord Vaughan, Baron of Fethard Tipperary
- Born: Ernest Edmund Henry Malet Vaughan; 8 February 1892; Cardiganshire, Wales
- Died: 30 June 1965
- Buried: Saint Afan's Church, Llanafan; 52.3313°N 3.9321°W
- Residence: Trawsgoed, near Llanafan, Ceredigion; Wales
- Wars and battles: World War I, World War II
- Spouses: Regina de Bittencourt (m. 1914; died 1944) Audrey Meakin (m. 1961)
- Issue: 4
- Heir: John Vaughan (son)
- Parents: George Vaughan, 6th Earl of Lisburne; Evelyn Probyn
- Occupation: Lord Lieutenant of Cardiganshire, High Sheriff

Ernest Edmund Henry Malet Vaughan, 7th Earl of Lisburne KStJ (8 February 1892 – 30 June 1965), of Trawsgoed, Cardiganshire, was a Welsh nobleman.

== Biography ==
The son of George Henry Arthur Vaughan, 6th Earl of Lisburne, and grandson of Ernest Augustus Malet Vaughan, 5th Earl of Lisburne, he succeeded his father as 7th Earl of Lisburne, 10th Viscount Lisburne, and 10th Baron Fethard in the Peerage of Ireland on 4 September 1899.

Lisburne was commissioned as a probationary Second Lieutenant in the Scots Guards in February 1912, resigning his commission in April 1914. He fought in the First World War in the Welsh Guards, where he was mentioned in dispatches and was wounded. His wartime rank was made permanent after the war in 1921 until he resigned again in 1927. He served again in the Second World War as a Captain in the Welsh Guards, resigning from the army for a final time, with the honorary rank of Major, in 1945.

He held the office of High Sheriff of Cardiganshire in 1923. He held the office of Lord-Lieutenant of Cardiganshire between 1923 and 1956. He was vice-president of the University College of Wales in 1929. In 1935 he was appointed a Commander of the Most Venerable Order of the Hospital of St. John of Jerusalem (CStJ) and in 1955 a Knight (KStJ). He held the office of Justice of the Peace (J.P.).

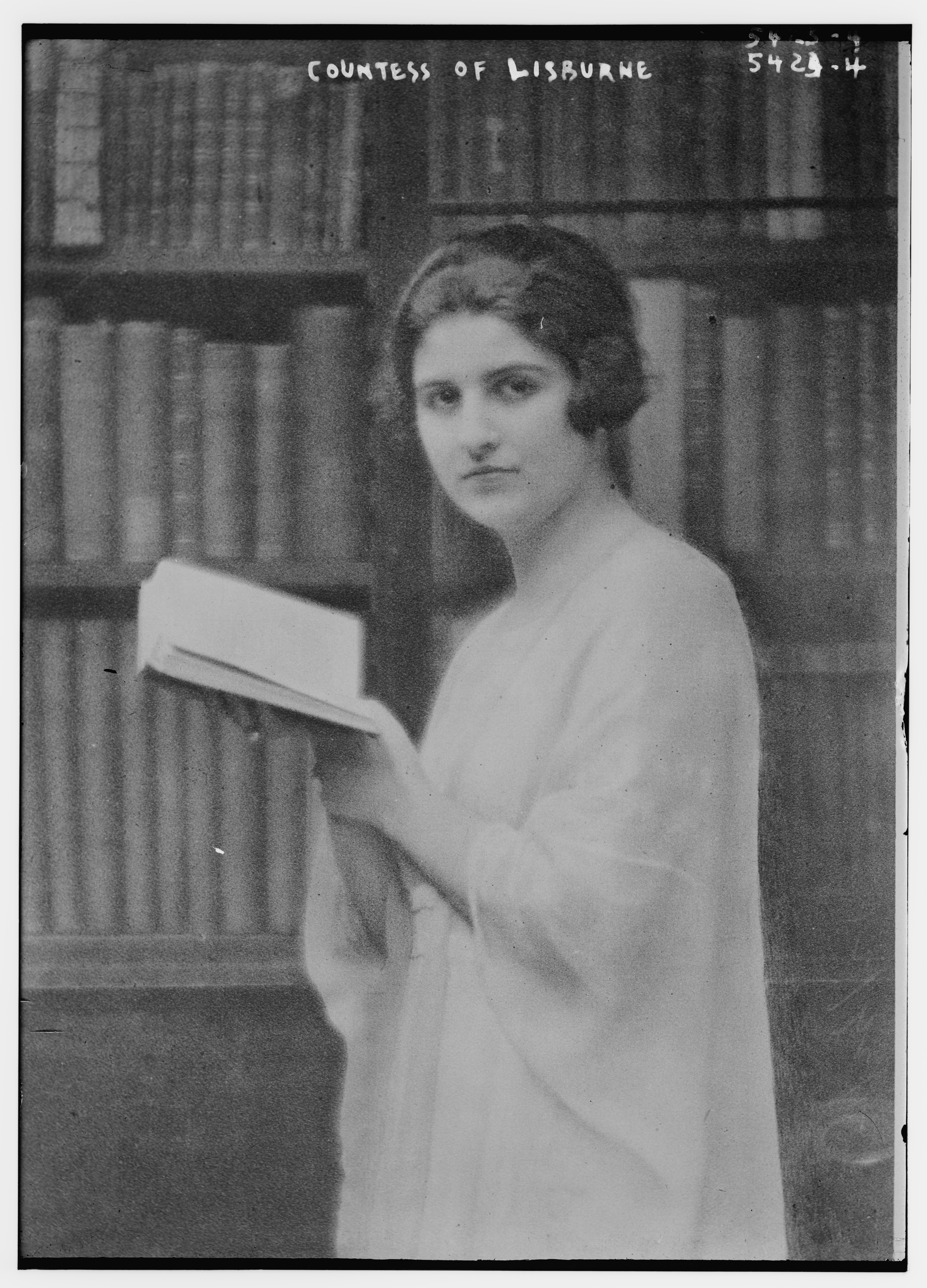
Regina, Countess of Lisburne

Vaughan married his first wife, Maria Isabel Regina Aspasia de Bittencourt, daughter of Don Julio Fermine Albert de Bittencourt on 16 July 1914. Secondly, he married Audrey Maureen Leslie Meakin, daughter of James Meakin and Emma Beatrice Wallace (stepdaughter of Lewis Milles-Lade, 3rd Earl Sondes) on 14 November 1961.

Vaughan and his first wife had four children:

- Lady Gloria Regina Malet Vaughan (1916 – 27 February 1998), married Sir Nigel Fisher and had issue
- John David Malet Vaughan, 8th Earl of Lisburne (1918–2014)
- Lady Honor Morvyth Vaughan (1919 – 25 July 2018), married Rhydian Llewellyn, son of Sir David Llewellyn, 1st Baronet, and had issue
- Lady Auriel Rosemary Malet Vaughan (20 January 1923 – 14 October 2014), known as an author as "Oriel Malet"

Honorary titles
Preceded by Lewis James Mathias	High Sheriff of Cardiganshire; 1923	Unknown
Preceded by Herbert Davies-Evans	Lord Lieutenant of Cardiganshire; 1923–1956	Succeeded by John Hext Lewes
Peerage of Ireland
Preceded by George Vaughan	Earl of Lisburne; 1899–1965	Succeeded by John Vaughan
