= Llanfechan =

Coordinates: 52.142°N 03.504°W

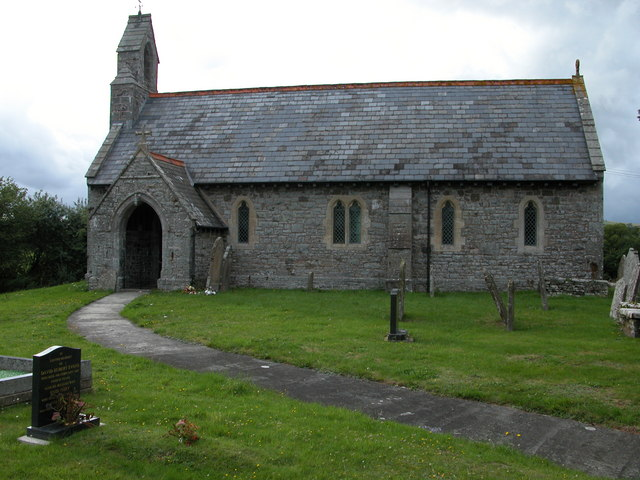
- St Afan's Church in Llanfechan

- Location within Powys
- Community: Treflys
- Principal area: Powys
- Preserved county: Powys
- Country: Wales
- Sovereign state: United Kingdom
- Police: Dyfed-Powys
- Fire: Mid and West Wales
- Ambulance: Welsh

Llanfechan is a small church settlement in the community of Treflys, consisting of a church and a farm, and the surrounding area, it is beside the A483 on the north side of the Irfon Valley near Cilmeri, about 7 kilometers (4.3 mi) west of Builth Wells, Powys, Wales.

Until 1986 Llanafanfechan was a community.

== Name ==
The community was originally known as Llanafan Fechan (Welsh for the "Lesser" fechan "Parish" llan of Saint Afan) to distinguish it from the larger one nearby, Llanafan Fawr. The settlement was referred to as Llanavon vechan in 1543. A third Llanafan also exists in Ceredigion, near the Trawsgoed Estate.

== The settlement ==
The Imperial Gazetteer of England and Wales (1870–72) describes the settlement as follows:

LLANAFAN-FECHAN, or LLANFECHAN, a parish in Builth district, Brecon; on the river Irvon ... Acres, 2,783. Real property, £927. Pop[ulation], 163. Houses, 25. The surface is hilly, and the rocks include slate. Gwarafog, an ancient mansion, is now a farm-house. The living is a p[erpetual] curacy, annexed to the vicarage of Llanafan-Fawr, in the diocese of St. David's. The church is small.

The population fell from about 170 in 1801 to less than 90 in 1961, peaking in 1831 at nearly 190. In 1881, agriculture dominated male employment (64% of 39) and apart from a schoolmaster all the rest had manual jobs of various kinds.

== Church ==
The present church dates to a refurbishment in 1866. The church is of typical medieval size and plan and this probably reflects the footprint of its predecessor. The 14th century font inside the church presumably comes from this earlier building. The church stands on an unnatural mound, assumed to be the debris of the earlier church, and within a raised churchyard about 45m across.

It was probably attached originally to the church at Llanafan Fawr ('Llanafan the Greater'), records of both churches during the 18th and 19th centuries show that curates from Llanafan Fawr also served Llanfechan. It was attached to the church at Llanganten by the early 20th century.

St Afan was a 5th or 6th century Welsh bishop, who was usually known as Afan Buallt, indicating a connection with the Buallt area. It is not known where or when he was a bishop, but the name by which he was referred suggests his diocese was around Builth in Brycheiniog with his seat at Llanafan Fawr.
