= St Afan's Church, Llanafan =

Saint Afan's
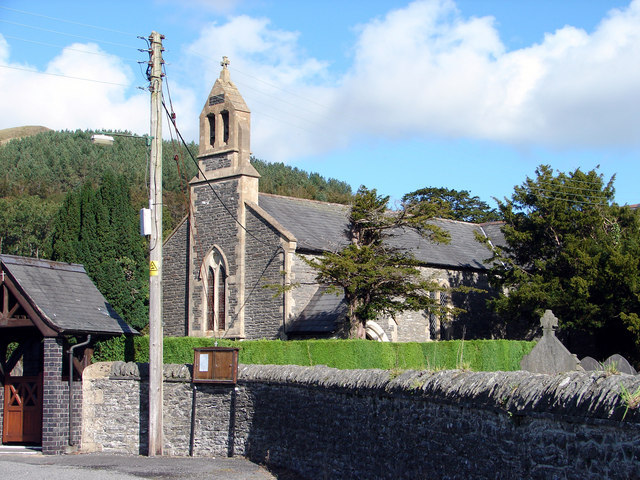
- Saint Afan's
- 52.3313°N 3.9321°W
- Location: Llanafan, Ceredigion
- Country: Wales
- Denomination: Anglican
- Website: Saint Afan Church

History
- Founded: 620
- Founder: Saint Afan

Architecture
- Heritage designation: Historic

Administration
- Diocese: Diocese of St David's
- Deanery: Llanbadarn Fawr
- Parish: Llanafan y Trawscoed

Clergy
- Priest: The Reverend I E Rose

Saint Afan's Church (SN68387192) is located in Llanafan, 8 miles (13 km) east of Aberystwyth, Ceredigion, in Wales.

== History ==
The original church on the site is credited to Saint Afan in the 6th century.

Gerald of Wales, the 12th century clergyman and historian, told a tale of "what happened, in the reign of Henry I, King of the English, to the castellan of Radnor castle, in the territory of Builth, which is not far away, being adjacent to his own lands, which he himself had conquered". This man and his dogs spent a night in the church of Saint Afan. They had been hunting near Builth. At first light the knight awoke to find that all his dogs had gone mad and he himself was completely blind. The blind knight joined the crusade and went to Jerusalem where he was led into battle and died an honourable death.

During the medieval period, the church was an outlying chapelry of Llanbadarn Fawr. The church lies within the upper division of the hundred of Ilar of Cardiganshire. For a great many years the tithes went to the Chichesters of Arlington, Devon, England. They are not known to have contributed to the church building, which for centuries was accepted as the responsibility of the Vaughan family of Trawsgoed.

In 1741, John Vaughan, 2nd Viscount Lisburne, was buried at Llanafan church in the family vault, and since then heads of the family and their wives have usually been buried there. The church was substantially remodelled early in the 19th century and completely rebuilt in 1873 by Ernest Vaughan, 4th Earl of Lisburne. A notable grave in the churchyard is that of Joseph Butler, a gamekeeper on the Vaughans' Trawsgoed estate, who was shot dead by a poacher, Wil Cefn Coch, in 1868. The killer escaped to Paddy's Run, Ohio (near present-day Morgan in Butler County), with the help of local people and died there in 1920.

== The present building ==
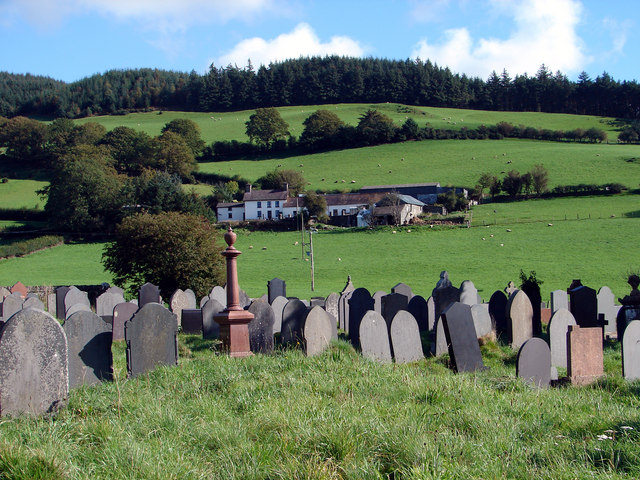
Cemetery at Llanafan Church

The present structure was remodelled in 1832. It is unclear when it was originally constructed, although a structure most probably existed much further back in time as the lands surrounding the church have belonged to the Vaughan family of Trawsgoed and their decadents since the 1200. As explained by Samuel Lewis, 1833:

The church is an ancient structure, consisting of a nave, chancel, and south transept; part of the ancient screen which separated the chancel from the nave is still remaining, and exhibits an elegant specimen of carved work; the ancient font, octangular in form, is also preserved. Among the communion plate is a curious ancient dish of silver, gilt, and embossed with twelve figures, of which ten represent warriors, and the other two dragons; all are arranged in couples, and engaged in combat. The church is situated within half a mile of the river, and in the churchyard is a fine avenue of trees, leading from the entrance of the cemetery to the south transept.

The building is noted for the high quality of the early 20th-century stained glass memorials to members of the Vaughan family. A copy of the Welsh Bible of 1620 (Welsh: Beibl Parry) is on permanent display. Two Vaughan family funeral hatchments are displayed in the chapel. The church is situated near the river Ystwyth, within Llanafan village, Ceredigion.

== Grwp Bro Ystwyth a Mynach ==
The church lies within the parish of Llanafan y Trawsgoed, which is in the benefice of Grwp Bro Ystwyth a Mynach, the deanery of Llanbadarn Fawr and the Diocese of St David's. As of 2011, the Associate Priest for the parish is I. E. Rose. Anglican services are conducted on the second and fourth Sunday of each month in English and Welsh.
