= St Afan's Church, Llanafan Fawr =

Church in Llanafan Fawr, Powys, Wales

Coordinates: 52.191°N 3.510°W

Saint Afan's Church is located in the village of Llanafan Fawr, Powys, in Wales. The name of the village honours Afan, its patron saint, who is said to have been buried there.

== History ==
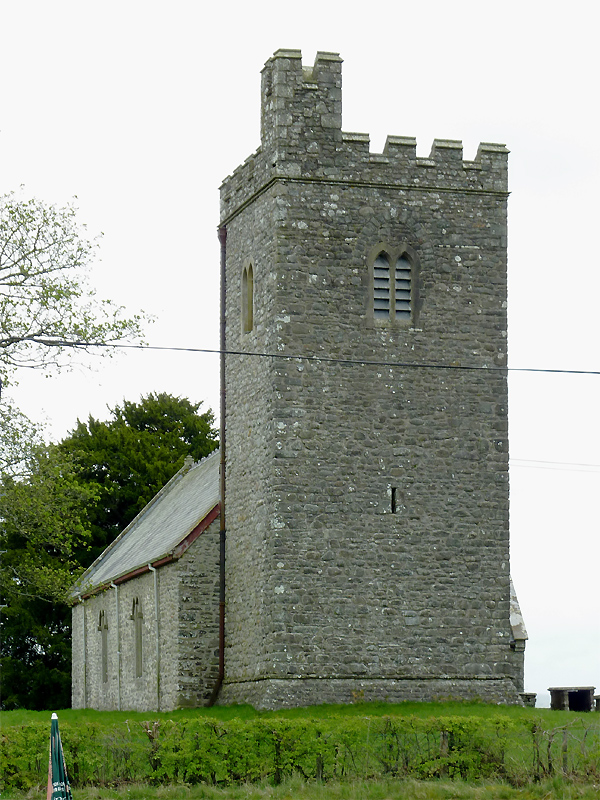
The church and the yew to the east

There is an ancient yew tree in the churchyard, which may predate the time of Saint Afan. Combined with other factors suggesting an ancient origin for the site (a curvilinear churchyard and the dedication of the church to Saint Afan), an early medieval beginning for the church seems likely, although the building as we see it has been much rebuilt.

== Conservation ==
The church is a Grade II listed building. Cadw says that it was "listed primarily for its fine tower of C18 date, with the mainly Victorian church retaining its character also". Cadw also mentions the prominent siting of the church, its association with St Afan and "the C7-9 work" (referring to ancient stones and earthworks).
