= Llanafan, Ceredigion =

Village in Ceredigion, Wales

Coordinates: 52°20′N 3°56′W

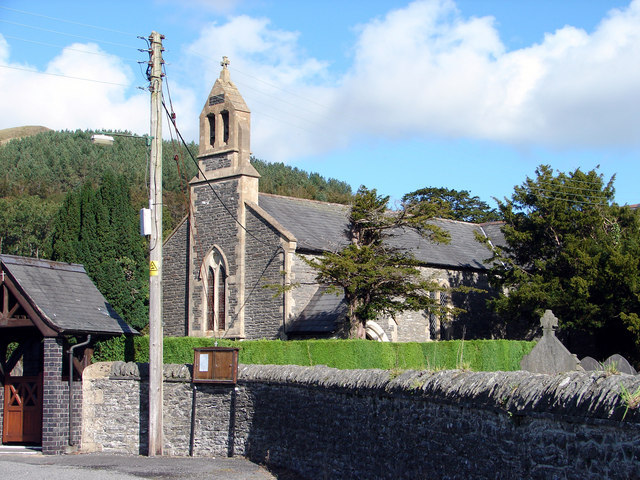
St Afan's.

Llanafan is a small village between Tregaron and Aberystwyth, Ceredigion, in Wales. Llanafan is around ten miles from Aberystwyth and Tregaron. It is named for its parish church, St Afan's (Capel Afan), which serves as the chapel for the nearby Trawsgoed Estate. (The combined parish is now known as Llanafan y Trawsgoed) Its eponymous saint supposedly founded the settlement in the 7th century. The village also has a hall and primary school founded in 1856 by Ernest Vaughan, 4th Earl of Lisburne, for which it was originally known as the Earl of Lisburne School.

The grave of Joseph Butler can be found in St. Afan's graveyard. Butler, a gamekeeper on the nearby Trawscoed estate was shot by a poacher William Richards, known as Wil Cefn Coch, who was reportedly hidden by locals before escaping to Liverpool and sailing to America disguised as a woman. After landing in Pennsylvania Cefn Coch made his way to an established Welsh community in Paddy's Run (Shandon), Ohio (near to the present day Morgan in Butler County) where he lived out his days until his death in 1920. The gravestone reads 'Shot by a poacher' and is dated 1868.

== See also ==
- Llanafan Fawr & Fechan in Brecknockshire
