= John Vaughan, 3rd Earl of Lisburne =

British politician

John Vaughan, 3rd Earl of Lisburne (3 May 1769 – 18 May 1831), known as the Honourable John Vaughan until 1820, was a British soldier and Member of Parliament for Cardigan Boroughs.

Lisburne was the younger son of Wilmot Vaughan, 1st Earl of Lisburne. He served in the Army, transferring from the 87th Foot to the 58th Foot as a captain in 1795, and being promoted to major the next month and lieutenant-colonel later the same year. He eventually achieved the rank of colonel.

== Political career ==
In 1795, he sought election to the House of Commons for Berwick but withdrew when he faced a contest that the family could not afford. In the following year, Vaughan's father gave up the Cardiganshire county seat to Thomas Johnes, who had been his ally in county politics since 1774. As part of this arrangement, Vaughan was elected unopposed for the Cardigan Boroughs constituency.

In 1812, he was opposed by Herbert Evans of Higmead, who was supported by several landed families. Vaughan won by eighty votes but immediately after the result was announced, Evans alleged that the return was irregular and illegal.

By the end of his parliamentary career, Vaughan was heavily in debt. In 1816, Pryse Pryse of Gogerddan withdrew from a contest for the Cardiganshire county constituency on the understanding that he would receive support as a candidate for the seat of the borough at the next election. When an election was called two years later, Vaughan withdrew rather than face a contest. To compound matters he also failed to obtain the post of Lord Lieutenant of Cardiganshire.

== Personal life ==
On 6 May 1820, Vaughan succeeded his half-brother in the earldom. But as this was an Irish peerage it did not entitle him to a seat in the House of Lords.

Lord Lisburne married Lucy, daughter of William Courtenay, 2nd Viscount Courtenay, in 1798. He died in May 1831, aged 62, and was succeeded in his titles by his son Ernest.

== Sources ==
- Kidd, Charles, Williamson, David (editors). Debrett's Peerage and Baronetage (1990 edition). New York: St Martin's Press, 1990.
- Leigh Rayment's Peerage Pages

Parliament of Great Britain
Preceded by John Campbell	Member of Parliament for Cardigan Boroughs; 1796–1800	Succeeded by Parliament of the United Kingdom
Parliament of the United Kingdom
Preceded by Parliament of Great Britain	Member of Parliament for Cardigan Boroughs; 1801–1818	Succeeded by Pryse Pryse
Peerage of Ireland
Preceded by Wilmot Vaughan	Earl of Lisburne; 1820–1831	Succeeded by Ernest Augustus Vaughan
