= Marjorie Fleming =

Scottish child writer (1803–1811)

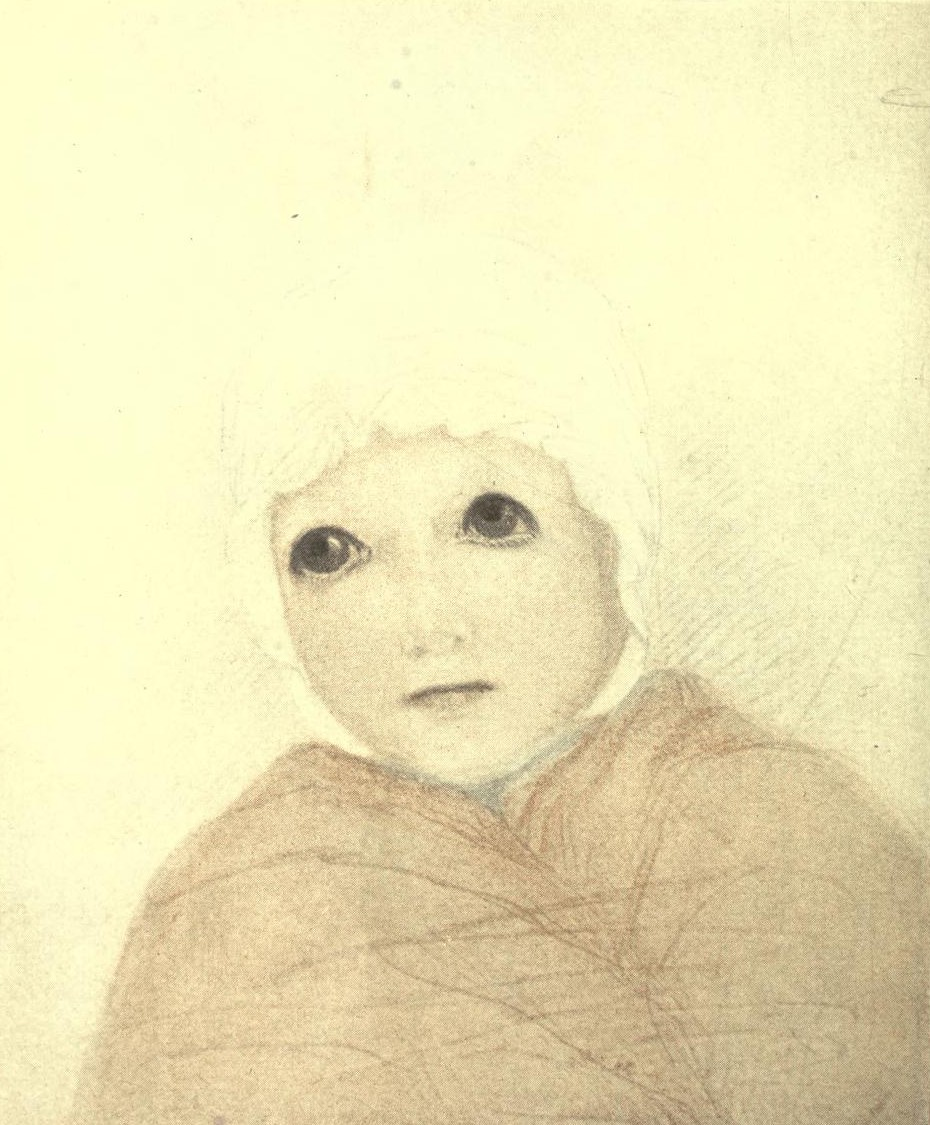
Portrait of Marjorie Fleming during her last illness. From a water-colour drawing, probably by Miss Isa Keith, 1811.

Marjorie Fleming (also spelt Marjory; 15 January 1803 – 19 December 1811) was a Scottish child writer and poet. She gained appreciation from Robert Louis Stevenson, Leslie Stephen, and possibly Walter Scott.

== Life ==
Born in Kirkcaldy, Fife, Scotland on 15 January 1803, Marjorie was the third child of the Kirkcaldy accountant James Fleming (died c. 1840) and his wife Isabella (daughter of James Rae), also the name of her elder sister and of her cousin and friend Miss Crauford (variously spelled). Her uncle Thomas Fleming was minister of Kirkcaldy parish church. Her mother's relations were acquainted in Edinburgh with the young Walter Scott.

Marjorie spent most of her sixth, seventh and eighth years in Edinburgh under the tutelage of a cousin, Isabella Keith, who was about 17. Isabella married in 1824 James Wilson (1795–1856), the zoologist brother of the writer Christopher North, and had two children. She died in 1837.

Marjorie returned to Kirkcaldy in July 1811, but wrote on 1 September in a letter to Isabella Keith, "We are surrounded with measles at present on every side." She herself contracted measles in November and apparently recovered, but then died, of what was described as "water on the head" and is now considered to have been meningitis, on 19 December 1811. She was a month short of her ninth birthday.

The monument marking her grave, south of Abbotshall parish church in Kirkcaldy, was not erected until 1930. It was designed by Pilkington Jackson. The stone was gifted by members of her family and the ceremony was attended by hundreds of locals.

== Writings ==
The order of the three copybooks established by Arundell Esdaile for the 1934 facsimile edition and followed by Sidgwick, is the reverse of the one found in earlier editions. Her copybooks begin with a somewhat startling, laconic tribute to Isabella Keith: "Many people are hanged for Highway robbery Housebreking Murder &c. &c. Isabella teaches me everything I know and I am much indebted to her she is learnen witty & sensible."

The diary includes a wide variety of observations: "The Monkey gets as many visitors as I or my cousins." "I like to here [sic] my own sex praised but not the other." "I never read Sermons of any kind but I read Novelettes and my bible." Fleming is notable for a diary that she kept for the last 18 months of her life. Diary keeping by children was encouraged in the United Kingdom throughout the 19th century. (A notable published example from a generation later is that of the English girl Emily Pepys.)

The manuscripts of her writings are now kept in the National Library of Scotland. However, for fifty years after her death they remained unpublished. The first account of her, with long extracts from the journals, was given by a London journalist, H. B. Farnie, in the Fife Herald, and then reprinted as a booklet entitled Pet Marjorie: a Story of Child Life Fifty Years Ago.

== Legacy ==
The rumour that Marjorie's poems were admired by Walter Scott derives from an 1863 article in the North British Review by Dr John Brown MD of Edinburgh. He acknowledged a debt to Marjorie's younger sister Elizabeth Fleming (1809–1881) for the loan of the letters and journals. He included twice as much as Farnie from the latter, as well as 100 lines of her verse. The direct, albeit sole evidence of Scott's interest appears in a long letter from Elizabeth to Brown.

The life and writings of Marjorie Fleming became hugely popular in the Victorian period, although the editions published were severely truncated and re-worked, as some of her language was thought inappropriate for an eight-year-old to use. Even Lachlan Macbean's editions of 1904 and 1928 relied on earlier bowdlerized texts.

The Sidgwick edition of 1934, which followed a facsimile edition of the same year, cites two other famous literary admirers. On the dust jacket, Robert Louis Stevenson is quoted as saying, "Marjory Fleming was possibly – no, I take back possibly – she was one of the noblest works of God." Leslie Stephen, in the entry he gave her in The Dictionary of National Biography in 1898, claimed that "no more fascinating infantile author has ever appeared."

Mark Twain's account of her is something of a reaction to the "queasy sensations" caused by Brown's sentimentality: "She was made out of thunder-storms and sunshine, and not even her little perfunctory pieties and shop-made holinesses could squelch her spirits or put out her fires for long... and this tainted butter soon gets to be as delicious to the reader as are the stunning and worldly sincerities around it every time her pen takes a fresh breath."

Marjory's "appetite for books" is noted, among others, by Kathryn Sunderland in her entry for the Oxford Dictionary of National Biography: "She records enjoying the poems of Pope and Gray, the Arabian Nights, Ann Radcliffe's 'misteris [sic] of udolpho', the Newgate calendar, and 'tails' by Maria Edgeworth and Hannah More." This literary bent is apparent also in the sometimes pithy comments in the journals and in her valiant attempts to write in rhyming couplets. Two of her verses are longer pieces probably inspired by history lessons: "The Life of Mary Queen of Scots by M. F." and "The Life of the King Jamess", dealing briefly with the first five Scottish kings of that name.

"Marjorie" is a spelling popularized by her later editors. "Marjory" was the spelling used by the Fleming family. Her familiar names included Madgie, Maidie, Muff and Muffy, but Pet is not recorded before the appearance of Farnie's account of her. Nonetheless, "'Pet Marjorie' is now carved on her (modern) tombstone in Abbotshall Kirkyard at Kirkcaldy."

Marjorie's life and the legend that formed around her writings is analysed in the first chapter of Alexandra Johnson's The Hidden Writer: Diaries and the Creative Life. Johnson says that as Marjorie continued to write under the tutelage of her cousin, she "discovered that every writer has a critic shadowing her shoulder. The drama of her journals is watching who won."

Fleming was also the subject of a fictionalized biography by Oriel Malet.
