= Oriel Malet =

Welsh-born author in English 1923–2014

Lady Auriel Rosemary Malet Vaughan (20 January 1923 – 14 October 2014) was a Welsh-born author of literary fiction and biographies, who wrote under the name of Oriel Malet. Among her works is a fictionalized biography of the Scottish child poet and writer Marjory Fleming and a volume charting her 30-year friendship with Daphne Du Maurier.

== Family ==
Her parents were Ernest Edmund Henry Malet Vaughan, 7th Earl of Lisburne, and Maria Isabel Regina Aspasia de Bittencourt. Her godmother was the French actress and singer Yvonne Arnaud, whom Malet wrote about in her book Marraine: A Portrait of My Godmother (1961).

== Life and work ==
After spending her childhood in Wales, Malet wrote her first novel at the age of 17, Trust in the Springtime, which was published in 1943. This was followed by My Bird Sings (1946), for which she was awarded the John Llewellyn Rhys Prize in the same year. Among her other works is a fictionalised biography of Marjory Fleming, the child poet and writer, written when Malet was 20. Malet spent much of her life in France. After initially moving to Paris, she lived in Eure, Normandy.

Malet was a close friend of the author Daphne du Maurier. Their friendship is documented in Letters from Menabilly: Portrait of a Friendship (1994), a collection of du Maurier's letters to Malet over the course of 30 years, with accompanying commentary by Malet.

== Bibliography ==
- My Bird Sings (1945) : London, Faber
- Marjorie Fleming (1946) : London, Faber
- Beginner's Luck (1952) : London, Chatto and Windus
- Marraine: a Portrait of my Godmother (1961/1965) : London, Heinemann
- Letters from Menabilly: Portrait of a Friendship (1994)
