= Y Gors, Ceredigion =

Hamlet in Ceredigion, Wales

Coordinates: 52.377225°N 4.014085°W

Y Gors
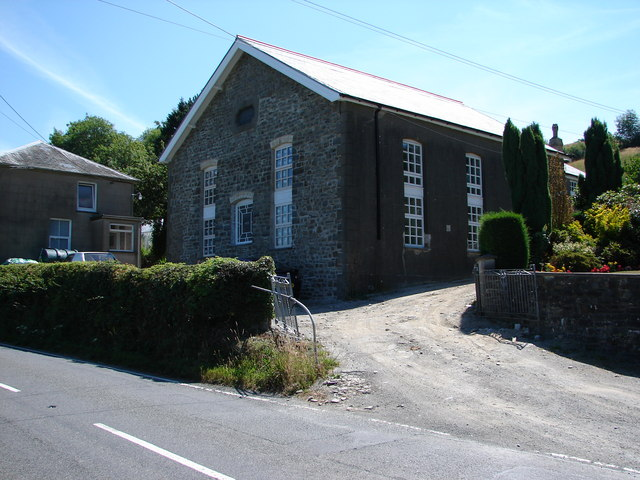
- Former Horeb chapel

- Location within Ceredigion
- OS grid reference: SN 6300 7737
  - Cardiff: 71.5 mi (115.1 km)
  - London: 176.1 mi (283.4 km)
- Community: Trawsgoed
- Principal area: Ceredigion
- Country: Wales
- Sovereign state: United Kingdom
- Post town: Aberystwyth
- Postcode district: SY23
- Police: Dyfed-Powys
- Fire: Mid and West Wales
- Ambulance: Welsh
- UK Parliament: Ceredigion Preseli
- Senedd Cymru – Welsh Parliament: Ceredigion

Y Gors is a hamlet in the community of Trawsgoed, Ceredigion, Wales, which is 71.5 miles (115.1 km) from Cardiff and 176.1 miles (283.4 km) from London. Y Gors is represented in the Senedd by Elin Jones (Plaid Cymru) and is part of the Ceredigion Preseli constituency in the House of Commons.

== See also ==
- List of localities in Wales by population
