= T. Harri Jones =

Welsh poet and lecturer (1921–1965)

Thomas Henry "Harri" Jones (21 December 1921 – 29 January 1965) was a Welsh poet and university lecturer in Britain and Australia. Born in Wales, he wrote in English.

== Biography ==
Jones was born at Cwm Crogau, near Llanafan Fawr in Brecknockshire (Powys), Wales, the son of a navvy and a domestic worker. His grandfather was a sheepherder who forecast at Jones' birth that he would have a future as a poet.

Jones studied English at the University College of Wales, Aberystwyth. His studies were interrupted in 1941 when, during World War II, he volunteered for the Royal Navy. Jones served until 1946. He graduated in 1947 and gained a Master of Arts degree in 1949. From 1951 to 1959, he taught in Portsmouth, Hampshire and during this period wrote The Enemy in the Heart (1957).

In 1959, Jones accepted an appointment as a lecturer (senior lecturer from 1962) in English at University of Newcastle in Newcastle, New South Wales, and so emigrated to Australia. His collections of poetry, Songs of a Mad Prince and The Beast at the Door, were published in 1960 and 1963. He drowned accidentally at Newcastle in January 1965. His ashes were returned to Wales and buried at Llanafan Fawr. He is commemorated by a statue in Llangammarch Wells.

While he was well known for his own poetry, he was also remembered for his virtuosity as a reader and lecturer. Listeners in his classes and in private readings were riveted by his fine Welsh voice. After his death in 1965, family and friends collected funds in his memory to set up a poetry prize to continue in perpetuity. Several of his students went on to establish fine careers of their own as writers and academics. The Harri Jones Memorial Prize was incorporated into the Newcastle Poetry Prize in 2011. It is awarded to the best poem in the anthology by a poet under the age of 36.

He was survived by his wife, Madeline Scott, and three daughters. His book The Colour of Cockcrowing was published posthumously in 1966. The Collected Poems of T. Harri Jones appeared in 1977. Jones wrote poetry in English rather than Welsh. Although his father spoke Welsh and English, his mother spoke only English, and that was the language which Harri and his siblings adopted. He is considered one of the finest 20th-century Anglo-Welsh poets.

== Works ==
In Jones' own lifetime:

- The Enemy in the Heart (1957), London: Rupert Hart-Davis
- Songs of a Mad Prince (1960), London: Rupert Hart-Davis
- The Beast at the Door (1963), London: Rupert Hart-Davis

Published posthumously:

- The Colour of Cockcrowing (1966), London: Rupert Hart-Davis
- The Enemy in the Heart (with Songs of a Mad Prince; The Beast at the Door and The Colour of Cockcrowing (1966), London: Faber and Faber
- The Collected Poems of T. Harri Jones (1977), Gomer Press, ISBN 978-0850884128
