= Percy Benzie Abery =

Welsh photographer

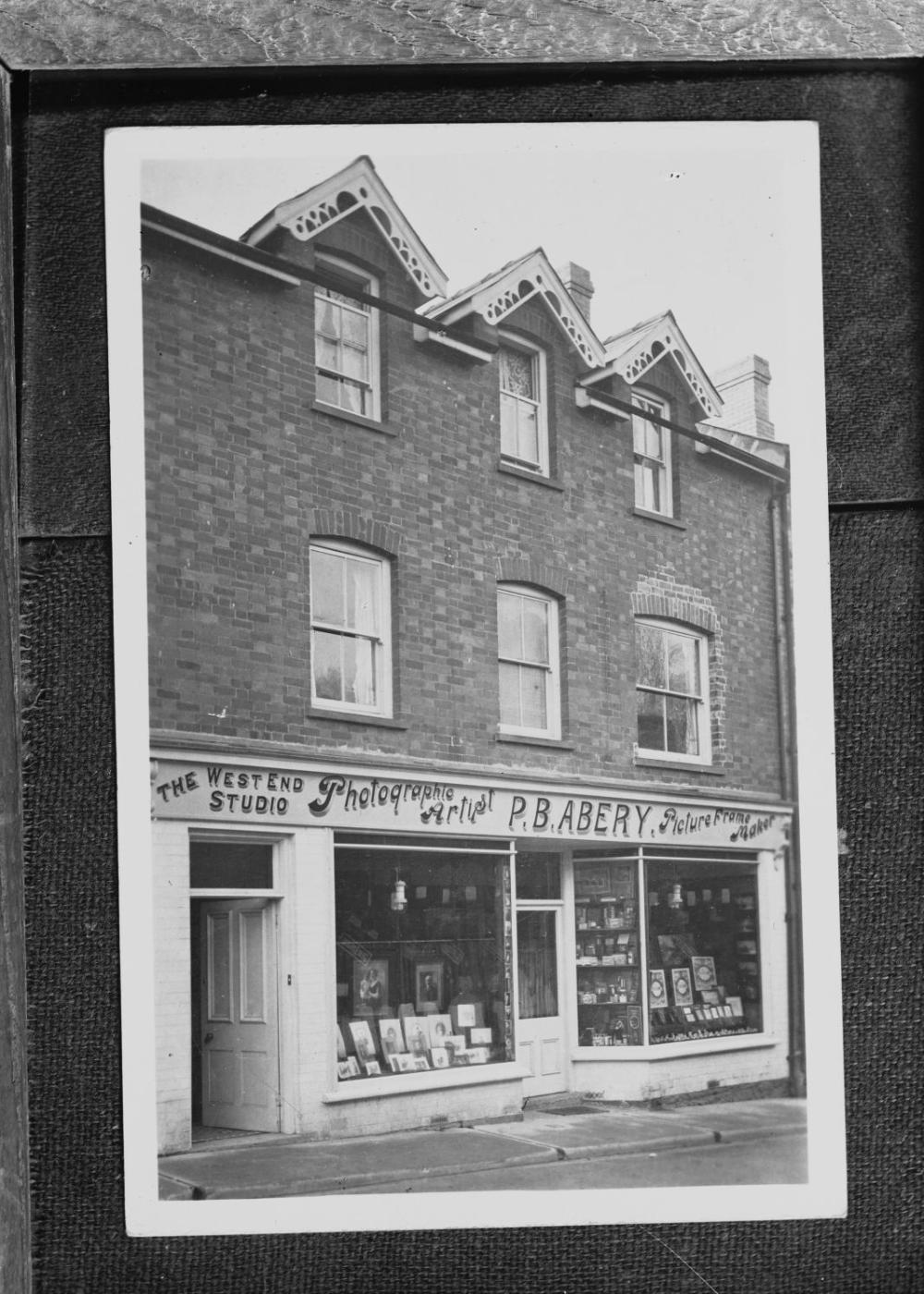
Abery's studio in Builth Wells

Percy Benzie Abery (1876 – 1948) was a successful Welsh photographer of the early to mid-20th century, based in Builth Wells.

Abery was born in Folkestone in Kent. He came to prominence as a photographer in the Builth Wells area, where he settled in 1898 aged 21. From 1911 onwards his business was located in West End Studio, where a blue plaque commemorates the fact. Though located in Builth Wells, he covered large parts of Mid-Wales and was involved in press photography, publishing postcards as well as the stock in trade studio portraits and weddings. He was also appointed the official photographer by Birmingham Water Works to document the building of the Elan Valley Reservoirs.

As the popularity of personal cameras took off after World War I, Abery added a developing and printing side to his business.

Abery photographed many aspects of rural life, many of which photographs have now disappeared. He died on 20 January 1948, and his ashes were scattered in the sea off Aberystwyth.

Prior to his death in 1948 in Breconshire, he selected 1,580 of his glass negatives to be donated to the National Library of Wales in Aberystwyth.
