= Wilmot Vaughan, 2nd Earl of Lisburne =

Welsh landowner and Irish peer

Wilmot Vaughan, 2nd Earl of Lisburne (9 May 1755 – 6 May 1820), styled Hon. Wilmot Vaughan from 1766 to 1776 and Viscount Vaughan from 1776 to 1800, was a Welsh landowner and Irish peer.

He was the son of Wilmot Vaughan, 4th Viscount Lisburne, later Earl of Lisburne, and his first wife Elizabeth Nightingale, who died of complications from his birth. He was educated at Eton College, and on 4 January 1773, he matriculated at Magdalen College, Oxford.

He was Major-Commandant of the Cardigan Militia 1778–80.

Unfortunately, he showed signs of insanity as early as 1778, and he was declared a lunatic on 24 August 1779. By the time Vaughan succeeded his father as Earl of Lisburne in 1800, he was incurably insane, and his estates were placed in the hands of trustees. He spent most of his life at Shillingthorpe Hall, a private asylum in Lincolnshire, where he died unmarried on 6 May 1820. He was buried in the family vault at St. Andrew's Church, Enfield.

He was succeeded in his title and estates, worth £18,000 per year, by his half-brother John Vaughan.

Peerage of Ireland
Preceded by Wilmot Vaughan	Earl of Lisburne; 1800–1820	Succeeded by John Vaughan
