= Builth Wells Hospital =

- Powys Teaching Health Board
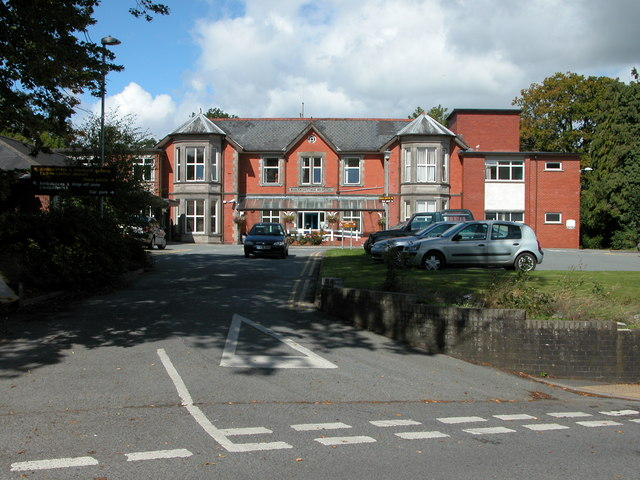
- Builth Wells Hospital

- Shown in Powys

Geography
- Location: Builth Wells, Powys, Wales
- Coordinates: 52.1477°N 3.4096°W

Organisation
- Care system: NHS Wales
- Type: Community

History
- Founded: 1897
- Closed: 2013

Links
- Lists: Hospitals in Wales

Builth Wells Hospital (Welsh: Ysbyty Llanfair ym Muallt) was a health facility in Bronllys, Wales. It was managed by Powys Teaching Health Board.

== History ==
The hospital, which was designed by Telfer Smith, opened as Builth Wells Cottage Hospital in 1897. The hospital joined the National Health Service in 1948. After the Glan-Irfon Health & Social Care Centre opened in the town, the hospital closed in 2013. The old hospital site was subsequently acquired by Wales & West Housing for redevelopment for residential use.
