= Cilmeri =

Village and community in Wales

Coordinates: 52°9′2.21″N 3°27′25.41″W

- Village and community
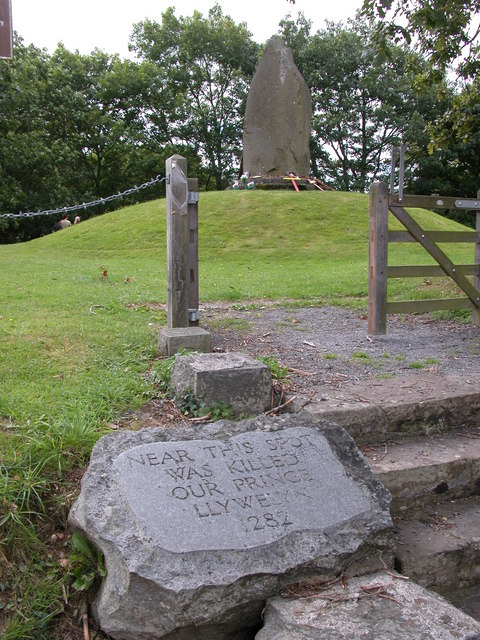
- Monument to Prince Llywelyn

- Location within Powys
- Principal area: Powys
- Country: Wales
- Sovereign state: United Kingdom
- Police: Dyfed-Powys
- Fire: Mid and West Wales
- Ambulance: Welsh
- List of places UK Wales Powys Community map: Map of the community

Cilmeri (Welsh pronunciation; also spelled as Cilmery) is a village and community in Powys, mid-Wales, United Kingdom in the historic county of Brecknockshire, two and a half miles west of Builth Wells on the A483 to Llandovery. The village is served by Cilmeri railway station on the Heart of Wales Line. In the 2001 census, Cilmeri Community had a population of 438 and 191 households. The population at the 2011 had fallen slightly to 431. The community includes the settlement of Llanganten and a small part of Builth Wells west of the River Irfon.

The village is famous for being close to the spot where the last native prince of Wales from the Royal House of Aberffraw, Llywelyn ap Gruffudd, was either killed in action or captured alive and subjected to summary execution by the soldiers of King Edward Longshanks, on 11 December 1282. A memorial stone to Llywelyn ap Gruffudd was erected on the site in 1956 and serves as the focal point for an annual ceremony of remembrance by Welsh nationalists on the anniversary of his death.

The community was formed in 1985, by a merger of the communities of Llanganten and Rhosferig, as well as part of Llanafanfechan.

== Memorial ==
The spot where Llywelyn fell was first marked by a stone obelisk erected in 1902. It was replaced in 1956 by the present monument, a rough block of granite from Trefor quarry in Llywelyn's native Caernarfonshire, set on a plinth on a low mound. Stones from the earlier memorial were incorporated into the steps leading up to the monument, inscribed in Welsh and English: "Ger y fan hon y lladdwyd Llywelyn ein Llyw Olaf 1282" ("Near this spot was killed our Prince Llywelyn 1282").

== See also ==
- Llanfechan, a nearby community
