= Llanafan Fawr =

Village and community in Powys, Wales

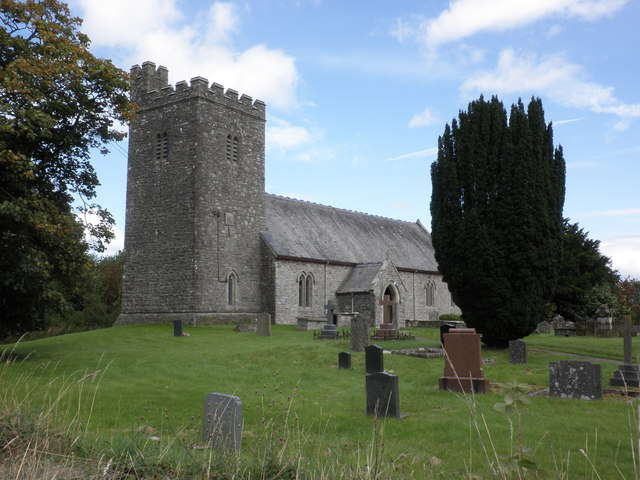
- St Afan's Church in Llanafan Fawr

- Location within Powys
- Population: 470 (2011)
- Community: Llanafanfawr
- Principal area: Powys
- Preserved county: Powys
- Country: Wales
- Sovereign state: United Kingdom
- Post town: BUILTH WELLS
- Postcode district: LD2
- Dialling code: 01982
- Police: Dyfed-Powys
- Fire: Mid and West Wales
- Ambulance: Welsh
- Website: community council site
- List of places UK Wales Powys 52.1908°N 03.5102°W Community map: Map of the community

Llanafan Fawr is a village, community and ecclesiastical parish in Powys, Wales. Located in the former cantref of Buellt (Builth) and historic county of Brecknockshire, the community includes the former parish of Llanfihangel Bryn Pabuan. (Note: Llanfihangel Bryn Pabuan is a tiny village, in a wedge of woods, beside the B4358 road. It has a 13th-century church, St Michael & All Angels, Tŷ Gwilim, an 18th-century timber and stone building, and the remnants of a cottage, probably Brest y Garth, home of David Price (1830–1859) who married Elizabeth Gwilim (born 1826) about 1850. Many Gwilim family members are buried in the churchyard.)

The parish has an area of slightly over 5,000 hectares (12,000 acres) (about twenty square miles) and a scattered rural population of more than a thousand. It is named after Saint Afan and was the centre of Cantref Buallt in ancient times, before the building of Builth Wells about 9 miles (14 km) away. The former spa town of Llandrindod Wells lies about 8 miles (13 km) to the north east.

An electoral ward of the same name exists. The population of this ward at the 2011 census was 1,386.

== Name ==
The village is also known simply as Llanafan or variantly spelled Llanafan-Fawr. In Welsh placenames, many smaller communities are named for their parish (llan), having grown up around the local church. This name of the village honours its patron saint Afan. "Fawr" is the mutated form of the Welsh mawr, meaning "big" or "great". The title distinguishes the community from the nearby Llanfechan (originally Llanafan Fechan or "Little Llanafan").

== History ==
Afan was a 6th-century saint supposedly related to the Cuneddan dynasty of Gwynedd. His relics are claimed by the local church, which commemorates him as a bishop, presumably over Brycheiniog but possibly only over the local parish. The c. 1300 inscription on the tomb reads: HIC IACET SANCTUS AVANUS EPISCOPUS. He was said to have been martyred on the banks of the Afon Chwefru during an attack by Irish pirates or Danes.

The Llanafan Fawr Agricultural Show is held on the third Sunday in September each year. The inaugural show was held in 1947 and it is believed to be one of the oldest shows in north Breconshire.

== St Afan's Church ==
The Church of St Afan has been rebuilt several times, the footings of the church-tower being one of the earliest remnants. Most was rebuilt in a Victorian reconstruction in 1886. Inside, carved stones, a pillar stone incised with a Latin cross and the font, all date from the 7th to 9th centuries.

There is a 2,200-year-old yew tree in the churchyard. The churchyard claims Saint Afan's relics and is also the burial place of Thomas Huet, who translated the Book of Revelation into Welsh in the 16th century. There is also a double gravestone unique in Britain; the left-hand inscription notes that its occupant was murdered and also bears the name of his murderer: John Price Who Was Murdered On The Darren Hill In This Parish By R Lewis 21 April 1826.

== Other notable sites ==
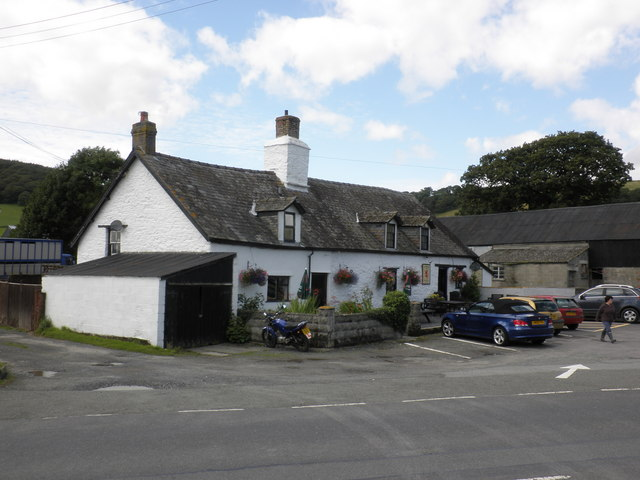
The Red Lion Inn

The Red Lion Inn is believed by some to date from at least 1188, when it was visited by Gerald of Wales during his tour of Wales recruiting men for the Third Crusade. Local folklore maintains that, while staying at the inn, Gerald learned of the miracle whereby the Anglo-Norman lord Philip de Braose was struck blind and saw his hunting dogs go mad when he disrespectfully used St Afan's Church as a makeshift hostel one night. (Note: "At this point I must tell you what happened, in the reign of Henry I, King of the English, to the castellan of Radnor castle, in the territory of Builth, which is not far away, being adjacent to his own lands, which he himself conquered. He had gone into the church of Saint Afan, called Llanafan in Welsh, and there he had spent the night with his dogs, which was a foolish and irreverent thing to do. He got up at first light, as hunters are wont to do, but he found that all his dogs had gone mad and that he himself was blind. He had lost his sight completely and he had to grope his way out with his hand...") He was told that his vision would only return if he resolved to leave his estates and fight in the Crusades. Some say his sight was restored upon his pledge but Gerald records that he travelled to the Holy Land and fought blind, where he was "immediately struck down by a blow from a sword and so ended his life with honour". From 1910 until 1991 the inn was kept by the Davies family. In 2004, the inn was advertised for sale for the first time in 300 years. Also that year, television cameras were employed at the inn to record the World Tippit Championships. The pub closed on 1 October 2019.

The vicarage for the church, formerly located beside the Afon Chwefru at the bottom of the hill, was named Persant (a corruption of Berth y Sanct, lit. 'The Saint's Hedge'). It was associated with the site of Saint Afan's supposed martyrdom at the hands of invaders. In the 1700s, it housed a Latin grammar school. C. J. W. Evans, the eighty-year-old son of the last vicar to reside there, Rev. Thomas Watkin Evans, witnessed the collapse of the building, after which the house was abandoned. It was later used during the Second World War by the Home Guard for hand-grenade practice.

== Notable people ==
- Marmaduke Gwynne (1691–1769), an early and influential Methodist convert
- T. Harri Jones (1921–1965), a Welsh poet and university lecturer, born at Cwm Crogau
