= Earl of Lisburne =

Title in the peerage of Ireland

Earldom of Lisburne
- Arms: Sable, a Chevron between three Fleurs-de-lis Argent. Crest: An Arm in Armour embowed, holding in the hand a Sword, all proper. Supporters: Dexter: A Dragon reguardant wings elevated Vert, gorged with a Collar Sable, edged and charged with three Fleurs-de-lis Argent, affixed thereto a Chain Or; Sinister:A Unicorn reguardant Argent, armed maned tufted and unguled Or, gorged with a Collar Sable, edged and charged with three Fleurs-de-lis Argent, affixed thereto a Chain Or.
- Creation date: 24 June 1776
- Created by: George III
- Peerage: Peerage of Ireland
- First holder: Wilmot Vaughan, 4th Viscount Lisburne
- Present holder: David Vaughan, 9th Earl of Lisburne
- Heir presumptive: Hon. Michael Vaughan
- Remainder to: the 1st Earl's heirs male of the body lawfully begotten
- Subsidiary titles: Viscount Lisburne; Baron Fethard
- Former seats: Trawsgoed; Mamhead House
- Motto: NON REVERTAR INSULTUS (I will not return unavenged)

Earl of Lisburne is a title in the Peerage of Ireland. It was created in 1776 for Wilmot Vaughan, 4th Viscount Lisburne. He represented Cardiganshire and Berwick-upon-Tweed in the House of Commons and held minor governmental office.

Not satisfied with the Irish title, Lisburne attempted to cajole his way into a title in the Peerage of Great Britain through his support of the Prime Minister the Duke of Portland. He quite unsuccessfully suggested in a letter that he would withdraw his support if he did not receive a peerage; Lisburne was horrified when his threat reached the ears of the king. "... his Majesty observed upon it that he could not have supposed that Lord Lisburne would have imagined that he was to be frightened into giving peerages—the moment was not open for explanation—your opinion, the declaration of your intentions, was in writing."

His younger son, the third Earl, sat as Member of Parliament for Cardigan. He was succeeded by his son, the fourth Earl. He also represented Cardiganshire in Parliament. His great-grandson, the seventh Earl, served as Lord Lieutenant of Cardiganshire. As of 2015 the titles are held by the latter's grandson, the ninth Earl, who succeeded in 2014.

The titles of Baron Fethard (or Baron Fethers), of Feathered in the County of Tipperary, and Viscount Lisburne, were created in the Peerage of Ireland in 1695 for John Vaughan, Member of Parliament for Cardiganshire and also Lord Lieutenant of that county. His son, the second Viscount, also represented Cardiganshire in Parliament and was Lord-Lieutenant of Cardiganshire. His younger brother, the third Viscount, was also Lord Lieutenant of Cardiganshire. He was succeeded by his son, the aforementioned fourth Viscount, who was created Earl of Lisburne in 1776.

The heir apparent to the earldom uses the invented courtesy title Viscount Vaughan.

The family seat traditionally was Trawsgoed (Crosswood) in Ceredigion (Cardiganshire), Wales. The Lisburne family still own a significant remaining acreage of the Trawsgoed Estate

== Viscounts Lisburne (1695) ==
- John Vaughan, 1st Viscount Lisburne (1670–1721)
- John Vaughan, 2nd Viscount Lisburne (1695–1741)
- Wilmot Vaughan, 3rd Viscount Lisburne (died 1766)
- Wilmot Vaughan, 4th Viscount Lisburne (1730–1800; created Earl of Lisburne in 1776)

== Earls of Lisburne (1776) ==
- Wilmot Vaughan, 1st Earl of Lisburne (1730–1800)
- Wilmot Vaughan, 2nd Earl of Lisburne (1755–1820)
- John Vaughan, 3rd Earl of Lisburne (1769–1831)
- Ernest Augustus Mallet Vaughan, 4th Earl of Lisburne (1800–1873)
- Ernest Augustus Malet Vaughan, 5th Earl of Lisburne (1836–1888)
- George Henry Arthur Vaughan, 6th Earl of Lisburne (1862–1899)
- Ernest Edmund Henry Malet Vaughan, 7th Earl of Lisburne (1892–1965)
- John David Malet Vaughan, 8th Earl of Lisburne (1918–2014)
- David John Francis Malet Vaughan, 9th Earl of Lisburne (born 1945)

== Present peer ==
David John Francis Malet Vaughan, 9th Earl of Lisburne (born 15 June 1945) is the son of the 8th Earl and his wife Shelagh Macauley and was styled as Viscount Vaughan from 1965.

In June 1973 Vaughan married Jennifer Jane Campbell, daughter of James Desire John William Fraser Campbell, and they have two children, Lucy Bronwyn (born 1971) and Digby Dylan (1973).

In 2003 his address was 4, Porthmeor Studios, Porthmeor Square, St Ives, Cornwall.

On 2 September 2014, Vaughan succeeded as Earl of Lisburne, Viscount Lisburne, Lord Vaughan, and Baron Fethard, all in the peerage of Ireland. His heir presumptive is his brother, the Hon. Michael John Wilmot Vaughan (born 1948), whose heir apparent is his son Edward Wilmot Malet Vaughan (born 1998).

== See also ==
- Viscount Lisburne
