= Llanganten =

Village in Powys, Wales

Coordinates: 52°09′30″N 3°26′32″W

Llanganten is a small village in the community of Cilmeri, Powys, Wales. The church in the village is dedicated to St. Cannen and it lies alongside the river Chwefri.

Until 1985 it was a community, when it became part of the new community of Cilmeri.
