= Ernest Augustus Malet Vaughan, 5th Earl of Lisburne =

British landowner (1836–1888)

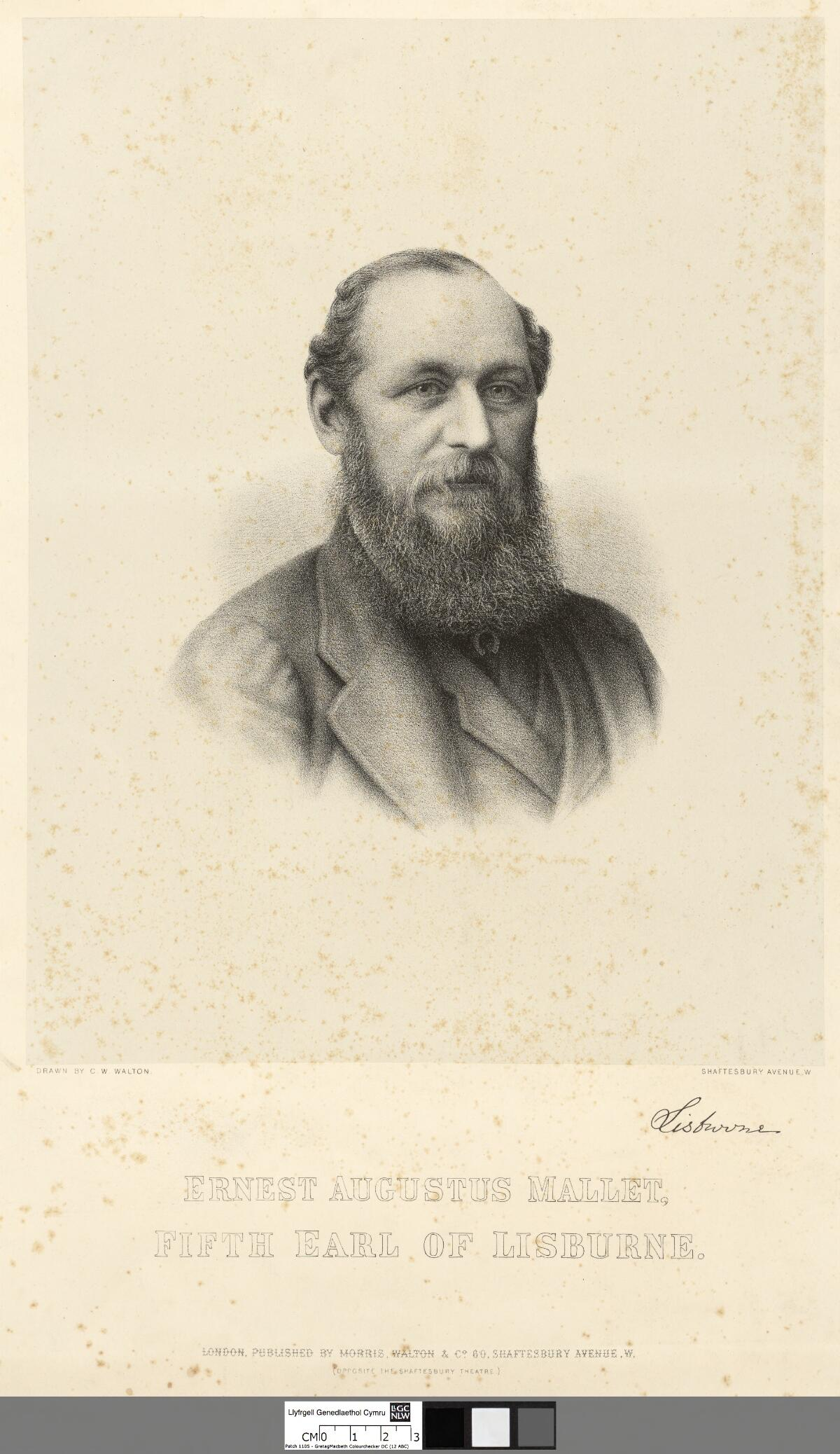
Portrait of Ernest Augustus Mallet, Fifth Earl of Lisburne (4674525)

Ernest Augustus Malet Vaughan, 5th Earl of Lisburne (1836-1888), was a prominent landowner in Cardiganshire, Wales who sought election to the British House of Commons at the 1868 General Election.

== Early life ==
Lisburne was the son of Ernest Vaughan, 4th Earl of Lisburne, whom he succeeded on 8 November 1873, and his wife, Mary (died 1851), second daughter of Sir Laurence Palk, Bt.. As this was an Irish peerage after 1801 it did not entitle him to a seat in the House of Lords.

== Family ==
He was married on 24 June 1858 to Gertrude Laura, third daughter of Edwyn Burnaby of Baggrave Hall, Leicestershire. She died in 1865. He then married on 15 May 1878 Alice Probyn (1854-1933), daughter of Edmund. As a widow she remarried in 1889 to William Amherst, 3rd Earl Amherst (1836-1910) and in 1914 to John Peter, Prince Sapieha (1865-1954).

== Later life and death ==
He succeeded his father in 1873 and died in 1888. While maintaining his support for the Conservative cause he largely withdrew from active politics and played little part in county government nor the Quarter Sessions.

Peerage of Ireland
Preceded by Ernest Vaughan	Earl of Lisburne; 1873–1888	Succeeded by George Vaughan
