= Ernest Vaughan, 4th Earl of Lisburne =

British politician

Ernest Augustus Vaughan, 4th Earl of Lisburne (30 October 1800 – 8 November 1873), styled Viscount Vaughan from 1820 to 1831, was a prominent landowner in Cardiganshire, Wales, who served from 1854 until 1859 as a Conservative member of the House of Commons.

== Early life ==
Lisburne was the son of John Vaughan, 3rd Earl of Lisburne, whom he succeeded on 18 May 1831, by his spouse the Hon. Lucy (d. 1821), fifth daughter of William, 2nd Viscount Courtenay. As this was an Irish peerage after 1801 it did not entitle him to a seat in the House of Lords unless elected as an Irish representative peer. He did however have the right, confirmed in August 1831, to vote for the representative peers from Ireland.

== Family ==
The Earl of Lisburne married firstly, on 27 August 1835, Mary (d. 1851), second daughter of Sir Laurence Palk, Bt., by his spouse Lady Elizabeth Vaughan. There were four children from the marriage, namely:

- Ernest Augustus Malet Vaughan, 5th Earl of Lisburne (b. 1836) who eventually succeeded to the titles. He was married on 24 June 1858 to Gertrude Laura, third daughter of Edwyn Burnaby of Bargrave, Leicestershire.
- the Hon. William Shafto Vaughan, born 1839, died 1853.
- Lady Elizabeth Malet Vaughan, who was married in 1860 to Inglis Jones of Derry Ormond, Lampeter.
- the Hon. Edward Courtney Vaughan, born 23 October 1841.

He married secondly, on 5 April 1853, Elizabeth Augusta Harriet Mitchell (d. 13 December 1883), daughter of Lady Harriett Isabella Somerset and widow of Col. Hugh Henry Mitchell (d. 20 April 1817). Lady Lisburne, as a child, is said to have been a Maid of Honour to Queen Adelaide at Kew on 11 July 1818. There was one child from the second marriage:

- Lady Gertrude Dorothy Harriet Adelaide Vaughan, born 1855, died 1869.

== Parliamentary career ==
Lisburne was regarded as the leading figure within the Conservative party in Cardiganshire. In 1854, he was elected to the House of Commons as the MP for Cardiganshire, succeeding Colonel W.E. Powell who had held the seat since 1816. Lisburne's political views and allegiance to the Conservative Party were expected to attract opposition and Thomas Lloyd of Bronwydd was mentioned as a possible candidate. However, Lloyd declined to stand and the Liberals, following the lead of the Pryse family of Gogerddan, chose not to contest the seat.

Having been returned unopposed, there was speculation of a renewed challenge from Thomas Lloyd at the 1857 General Election. Once again, however, Lloyd withdrew and Lisburne held the seat until 1859 when he stood down. He served as High Sheriff of Cardiganshire in 1851.

At the 1868 General Election, his nephew, Edmund Malet Vaughan, was the Conservative candidate for Cardiganshire, in a contest overshadowed by accusations of coercion. Following the retirement of Sir Thomas Lloyd, he was for a time the only candidate. He was eventually defeated by the Liberal candidate, Evan Mathew Richards.

== Later life ==
Lisburne concentrated much of his attention on improving the Crosswood estate. Large tracts of land in the Ystwyth valley were converted to woodland, while he also developed the Home Farm at Crosswood. The estate's herd of Hereford cattle was considered amongst the finest in Wales, while he also took a personal interest in maintaining hisflock of Shropshire Downs. Lisburne was involved in the restoration of several churches in the locality and was also endowed a number of schools. Relationships with his tenants were said to be good.

Lisburne's health deteriorated during 1872 and he spent that winter and the following spring at Torquay. Apparently in better health he returned to Crosswood for the summer, but he became ill again in the autumn and he died in early November.

Parliament of the United Kingdom
Preceded by William Edward Powell	Member of Parliament for Cardiganshire; 1854–1859	Succeeded by William Thomas Rowland Powell
Peerage of Ireland
Preceded by John Vaughan	Earl of Lisburne; 1831–1873	Succeeded by Ernest Augustus Malet Vaughan
