= Builth Wells =

Market town and community in Wales

Builth Wells: Welsh: Llanfair-ym-Muallt
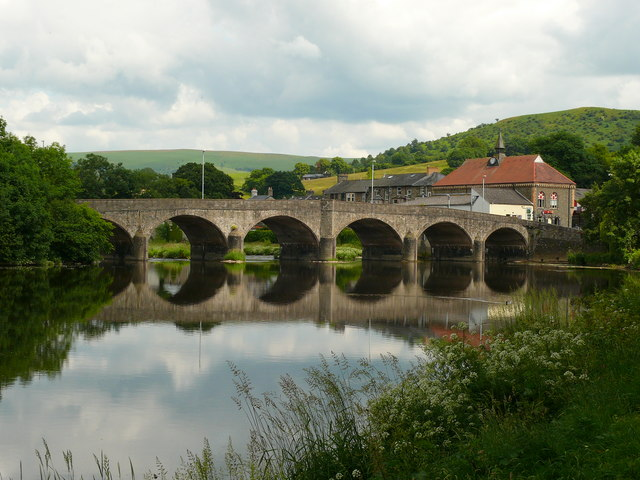
- Bridge over the River Wye at Builth Wells

- Location within Powys
- Population: 2,568 (2011)
- OS grid reference: SO035505
- Community: Builth
- Principal area: Powys
- Preserved county: Powys
- Country: Wales
- Sovereign state: United Kingdom
- Post town: BUILTH WELLS
- Postcode district: LD2
- Dialling code: 01982
- Police: Dyfed-Powys
- Fire: Mid and West Wales
- Ambulance: Welsh
- UK Parliament: Brecon, Radnor and Cwm Tawe
- Senedd Cymru – Welsh Parliament: Brecon & Radnorshire
- Website: builthwellstowncouncil.org.uk
- List of places UK Wales Powys 52.149°N 3.405°W Community map: Map of the community

Builth Wells (/ˈbɪlθ ˈwɛlz/; Welsh: Llanfair-ym-Muallt) is a market town and community in the county Powys and historic county Brecknockshire (Breconshire), mid-Wales, lying at the confluence of rivers Wye and Irfon in the Welsh (or upper) part of the Wye Valley. In 2011 it had a population of 2,568.

== Etymology ==
Theophilus Jones stated that the town had always gone by the name of Llanfair (English: Saint Marys) or Llanfair-ym-Muallt, (English: Saint Marys Llan in Builth) and that even in his time, anyone who said "Yr ydwyfi'n byw yrnhuallt" (English: I live in Builth) was understood to mean that they lived in the surrunding country, and not in the town itself.

The word Builth is an anglicisation of the Old Welsh Buellt or Buallt, which combines bu ([bɨː]) 'ox' and gellt (later gwellt) 'lea or leas'. Wells was added to the town's English name in the 19th century when its springs were promoted as a visitor attraction.

== History ==
The cantref of Buellt, which lends its name to the modern town, was centered around Builth, and remained unusually independent of larger powers during the Early Middle Ages.

The first major development recorded at the location of modern Builth was an 11th-century Norman motte-and-bailey castle, built by the marcher lord Philip de Braose on the banks of the Wye, where it overlooked an important ford across the river. Due to its highly strategic position, the castle regularly traded hands between the native Welsh princes and the marcher lords vying for control of the Welsh Marches. Later on, during his conquest of Wales in the late 13th century, the English king Edward I ordered the construction of the much larger, stone-built Builth Castle on the site of the older fort. In 1278, he also granted the town of Builth, which had sprung up around the fortification, the right to hold a market.

On 27 December 1690, a devastating fire tore through Builth, which at the time had a population of roughly 400. A significant part of the town was destroyed, with damages of £10,780 recorded, equivalent to millions today. Although donations towards the rebuilding effort came from as far afield as Lincoln, very little made it to the ordinary inhabitants of the town, who were forced to take apart the masonry of the castle to rebuild the town.

During the Victorian era, Builth began to gain a name for itself as a spa town, with the springs at Glanne Wells and Park Wells attracting significant tourism to the area. This success was buoyed by the opening of a railway station in 1860, which dramatically increased the towns popularity. The town's population grew substantially in this time period, from 677 in 1801 to 1,455 in 1881, and the town itself saw significant urban development, such as a drainage and water system installed in 1868 and a major expansion of housing to fit the growing populace.

As the tourism industry declined, Builth turned towards agriculture, and the town acquired its first dedicated livestock market in 1910. This eventually led to the Royal Welsh Agricultural Show settling on nearby Llanelwedd, just across the river, as its permanent home in 1963.

One of the best known Welsh hymns is also titled 'Builth'. Opening bars, sang here by Cymanfa Eisteddfod Llangefni

== Governance ==
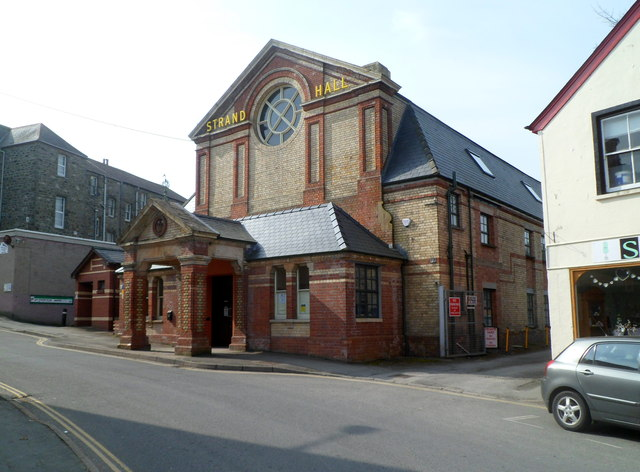
Strand Hall, Strand Street

There are two tiers of local government covering Builth Wells, at community (town) and county level: Builth Wells Town Council and Powys County Council. The town council is based at Strand Hall on Strand Street, which also serves as a community hall and events venue.

For elections to Powys County Council the community boundaries are coterminous with the Builth electoral ward, which sends one county councillor to sit on the council. Since 1995 the ward had been represented by Independent councillors. At the May 2017 elections the seat was won by former international rugby player, Jeremy Pugh.

Builth Wells is in the Brecon, Radnor and Cwm Tawe constituency for elections to the UK parliament and Brecon and Radnorshire for elections to the Senedd.

=== Administrative history ===
The ancient parish covering the town was called Builth, which formed part of the Builth hundred of Brecknockshire. In 1866 a local government district was created covering the more built-up part of the parish, governed by an elected local board.

Such local government districts were converted into urban districts under the Local Government Act 1894. The urban district was extended at the same time to cover the whole parish of Builth. In 1898, Breconshire County Council changed the urban district's name from Builth to Builth Wells, at the urban district council's request.

Builth Wells Urban District was abolished in 1974, with its area instead becoming a community called Builth Wells within the Borough of Brecknock in the new county of Powys. The former urban district council's functions therefore passed to Brecknock Borough Council, which was in turn abolished in 1996 and its functions passed to Powys County Council.

== Livestock breeds ==
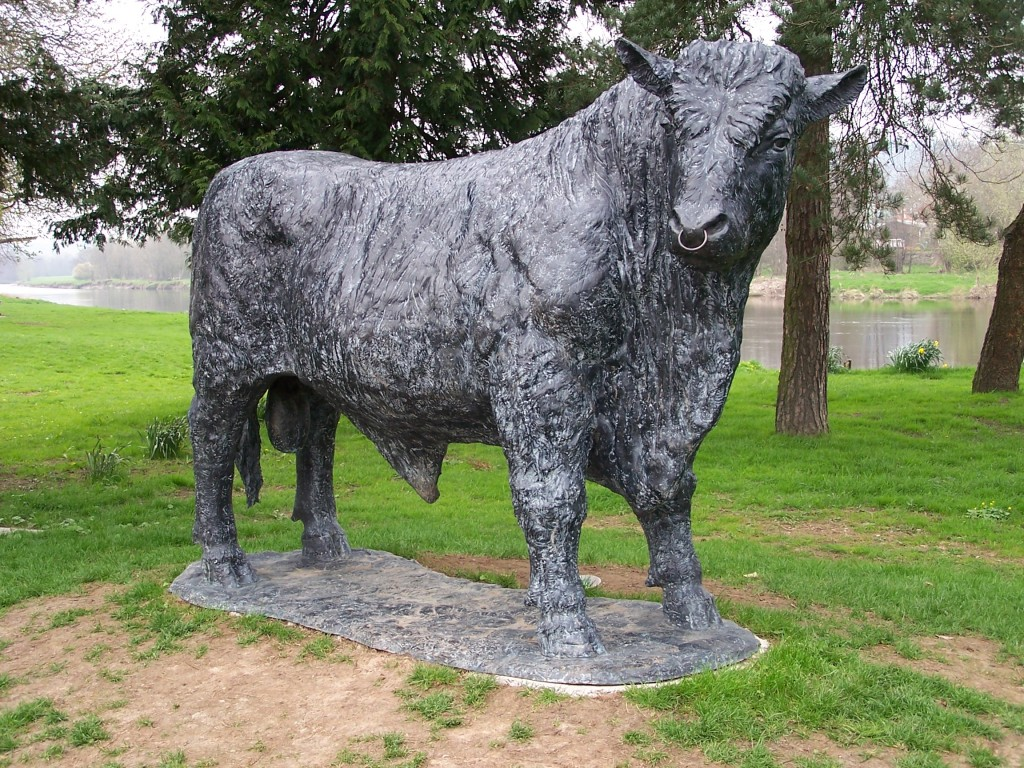
Bronze sculpture of a Welsh Black bull by Gavin Fifield

The White Bull of Builth may be a reference to a herd of White Park Cattle that lived in the area from Post-Roman times. Two herds survived in Wales to modern times. The laws of the time suggest that the medieval and later economy of the Welsh borders was strongly dependent on cattle. The Hereford cattle breed, named after Hereford market where it was most prominently sold was the main breed of the Welsh borders. Builth was the market for a variant of the Hereford called the Builth Smokey Face. This was the traditional animal of the area but the breed has not existed for many decades.

The Beulah Speckled Face is a local breed of sheep. Nearby Mynydd Epynt was famous for its horses until it was seized for military training purposes.

The beef cattle market has vanished and economically sheep are now vastly more important than cattle with consequences for the traditional woodlands of the area, the salmon runs and other important ecological features.

== Industry ==
Llanelwedd Quarry was the source of the stone used in many of Builth's buildings, and in the dams along the Elan Valley. The quarry was the source of the first laumontite mined in Wales. It is operated by Hanson Aggregates.

== Transport ==
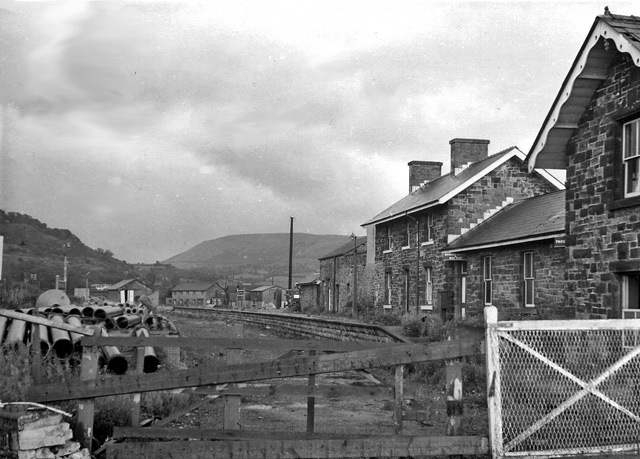
The remains of Builth Wells railway station in 1967

The town is served by Builth Road railway station on the Heart of Wales Line, which is located just over 2 miles to the north-west. The more central (Builth Wells) railway station on the Mid-Wales Railway was opened in 1864, and closed with the line in 1962 – actually before the Beeching Axe. It was located across the river, next to the present showground.

A dedicated cycle route linking the town with Swansea (NCR 43) has been proposed and a 13-mile section of the route from Swansea has already been developed.

One of the main Wales north-south trunk roads, the A483, passes through the town, using the former railway route. As of June 2009 part of this road, along with the other main route through town (A470), is the subject of a transport study by the Welsh Assembly to help alleviate traffic congestion in the town centre.

The bridge at Builth Wells carries vehicles on the A470. It dates from the 18th-century and has six masonry spans, with small cutwaters on the upstream side. The centre of the bridge has two pedestrian refuges. It was built in 1775 and widened in 1925. The river here marks the boundary between the old counties of Breconshire and Radnorshire.

== Education and recreation ==
Ysgol Calon Cymru is the main secondary school and is bilingual. It replaced Builth Wells High School in September 2018 and can draw on certain specialist teachers and facilities as is dual campus with its other site in Llandrindod Wells. In 2000 its predecessor was placed 67th in Wales (by percentage of its children, 59%, gaining 5 GCSEs at full pass grades A*–C). According to a 2010 report by Estyn its rate rose to 77%, making it 9th best performing (state secondary) in Wales and the only ranking in Powys after Llanidloes High School. A fall to two years of Special Measures was followed in 2017 by the closing report of the old school finding sufficient progress to remove it from those measures. Progress was ranked as strong as to six recommendations of 2015, in 2017, and sufficient progress as to the other.

The town features Wyeside Arts Centre, which has two cinemas and a live performance stage.

Builth Wells has a rugby union team called Builth Wells RFC, also known as 'The Bulls', who play on the Groe. The team play in the WRU SWALEC National League 2.

The town's football team is Builth Wells F.C. who play in the Ardal Leagues, the third tier of Welsh football.

Builth Male Voice Choir has approximately fifty members and performs concerts to support local and national charities.

Builth Wells also has a cricket pitch, tennis courts, a sports centre with squash courts, a 25m swimming pool and a bowling green.

== Notable people ==
See Category:People from Builth Wells.

- Caesar Jenkyns (1866–1941), footballer with over 200 club caps and 8 for Wales
- Percy Benzie Abery (1876–1948), photographer, settled locally in 1898
- Grenville Morris (1877–1959), footballer with over 450 club caps and 21 for Wales, all-time record goalscorer for Nottingham Forest (217 goals)
- David Milwyn Duggan (1879–1942), Canadian politician, emigrated in 1905
- Hilda Vaughan (1892–1985), novelist and short story writer
- Kevin Sheedy (born 1959), a football coach and footballer with 391 club caps and 46 for Republic of Ireland.
- Iolo Williams (born 1962), ornithologist, nature observer, TV presenter and author
- Alice Hart-Davis (born 1963), journalist and author
- Jack Harris (born 1986), singer and songwriter

== Buildings and landmarks ==
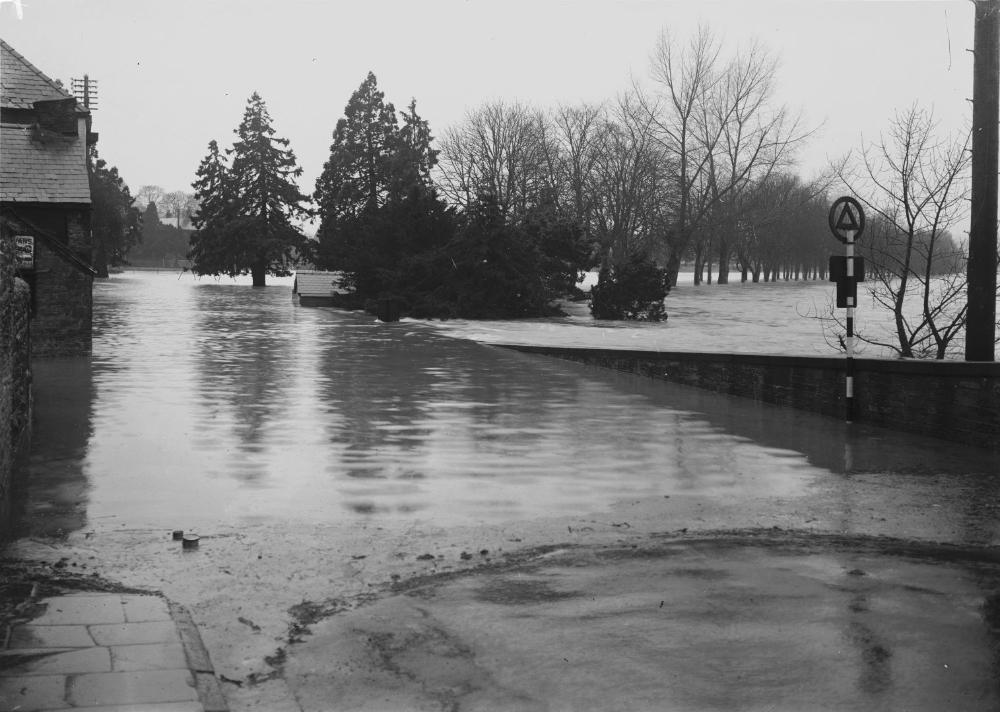
Flooding in 1910s; photo by Percy Benzie Abery.

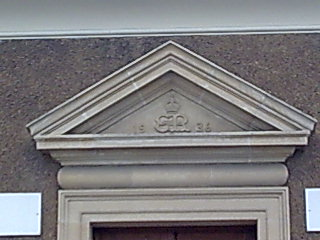
The cypher of King Edward VIII above the former Post Office

Builth Wells has a large number of Grade II listed buildings and fixtures.

A plaque on the wall of the post office stakes its claim as the only in England and Wales to bear a contemporary inscription to less-than-one-year monarch Edward VIII. The claim can be qualified to active post offices as the former one in Bradford-on-Avon has a similar insignia.

After a small health centre opened in the town, Builth Wells Hospital closed in 2013.

In the centre of the town is a large mural (about 35 feet (11 m) by 30 feet (9.1 m) wide) depicting Llywelyn ap Gruffudd, who was killed at the Battle of Orewin Bridge in nearby Cilmeri on 11 December 1282.
