= Trawsgoed =

Community and estate in Ceredigion, Wales

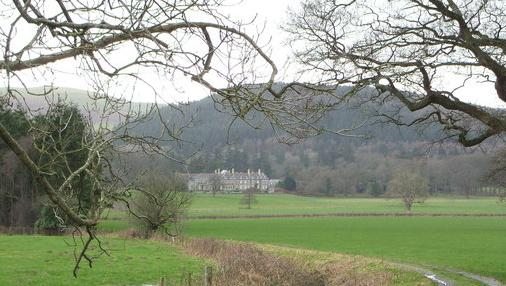
- Trawsgoed mansion seen from the park

- Location within Ceredigion
- Population: 912 (2021)
- OS grid reference: SN669731
- Principal area: Ceredigion
- Country: Wales
- Sovereign state: United Kingdom
- Post town: Aberystwyth
- Postcode district: SY23
- Police: Dyfed-Powys
- Fire: Mid and West Wales
- Ambulance: Welsh
- UK Parliament: Ceredigion Preseli
- Senedd Cymru – Welsh Parliament: Ceredigion Penfro
- List of places UK Wales Ceredigion 52.340°N 3.954°W Community map: Map of the community

Trawsgoed (Welsh for 'crosswood') is a community and an estate in Ceredigion, Wales. The estate is 8 miles (13 km) southeast of Aberystwyth, and has been in the possession of the Vaughan family since 1200.

The land falls within the ancient parish of Llanafan, in the upper division of the hundred of Ilar. In Wales, an ancient parish was a village or group of villages or hamlets and the adjacent lands. Originally they held ecclesiastical functions, but from the 16th century they also acquired civil roles. The parish may have been established as an ecclesiastical parish. Originally a medieval administrative unit, after 1597 ecclesiastical units were separated from civil parishes to serve the ecclesiastical needs of the local community. The Trawsgoed estate extended over 22 Cardiganshire parishes, including Llanafan. The community of Trawsgoed had a population of 912 at the 2021 census, and includes the villages of Llanafan and Llanfihangel-y-Creuddyn, and the hamlets of Y Gors (New Cross) and Cnwch Coch.

== History of ownership ==
The estate and mansion of Trawsgoed came into the Vaughan family by the marriage of Adda Fychan with Tudo, daughter and heiress of Ifan Goch of Trawsgoed, 'Evan the Red'. The Vaughans are descended from Collwyn ap Tangno, founder of the fifth noble tribe of North Wales, Lord of Eifionydd, Ardudwy, and part of Llŷn, who had his residence on the site of Harlech Castle.

The founder of the modern estate was the parliamentarian and lawyer Sir John Vaughan, who was made Chief Justice of the Common Pleas by Charles II. It was Sir John who acquired from the Earl of Essex much of the former monastic lands of the Cistercian abbey Strata Florida. At the same time, further land was added to the estate through his marriage to Jane Stedman, daughter of John Stedman of Ystrad Fflur and Cilcennin. The estate has been passed down in the landed family from father to son in a direct line since it was acquired by marriage in 1200. The Vaughans are one of the few aristocratic families who have retained possession of a house since first taking it on in the Middle Ages.

Trawsgoed became an estate in the English sense of the word in the 16th century. Strata Florida Abbey, in the centre of Wales, was given to the 1st Earl of Essex to broker during the English Reformation and dissolution of the monasteries, and he sold much of it to the Stedman family. Sir John Vaughan married the Stedman heiress and his brother, Henry, her sister. So almost all the abbey estate was taken over by the Vaughans. In 1695, John Vaughan of Trawsgoed, the grandson of Sir John Vaughan, was created Viscount Lisburne in the peerage of Ireland. during the Civil War he married Malet, daughter of the poet and courtier, the Earl of Rochester, and granddaughter of the Cavalier, Sir Henry Wilmot, 1st Earl of Rochester, the victor of the Battle of Roundway Down.

The Vaughan family was granted the title Earl of Lisburne in 1776 and remained at Trawsgoed mansion over successive generations. The family at one time owned estates in Northumberland and at Mamhead in Devon. In 1947 the mansion house became the headquarters of the Ministry of Agriculture, Fisheries and Food in Wales, and the home farm is still occupied by the Biotechnology and Biological Sciences Research Council (BBSRC) and managed by the Institute of Grassland and Environmental Research (IGER).

== Grounds ==
In 1873, the Vaughan's estate acreage at Trawsgoed was the largest in Cardiganshire at 42,666 acres (172.66 km^{2}) as listed in the government return of landowners. Sir Pryse Pryse of Gogerddan held 28,684, W.T.R. Powell of Nanteos held 21,933, John Waddingham of Hafod held 10,963 acres (44.37 km^{2}). The Vaughan family has for many years worshiped at St Afan's Church, Llanafan, that lies within the estate. It was chosen as a special stage in the British Rally from 2006 to 2008. The pleasure gardens surrounding the house, and the wider park, are designated Grade II on the Cadw/ICOMOS Register of Parks and Gardens of Special Historic Interest in Wales.

== Trawsgoed Mansion ==
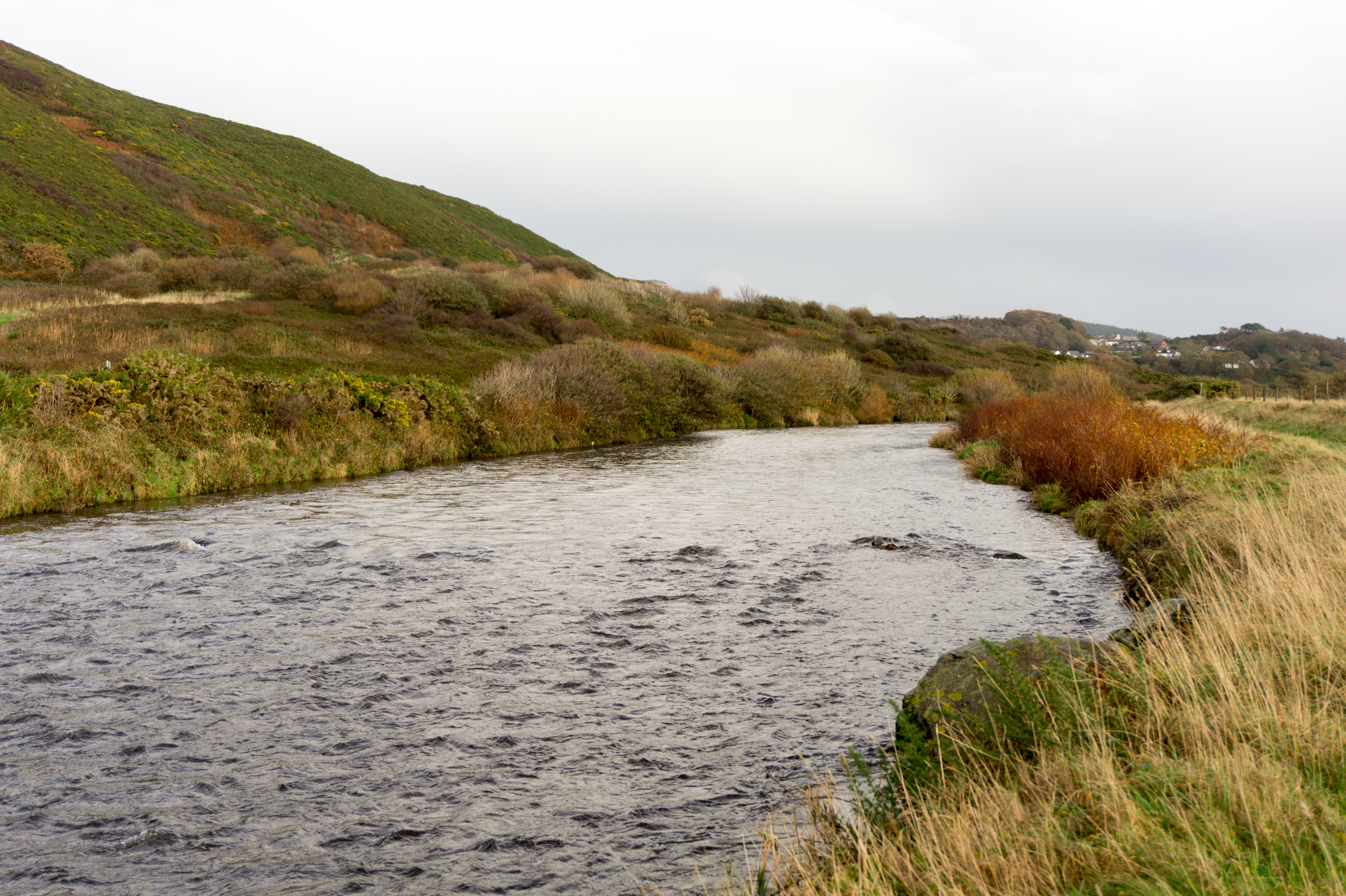
River Ystwyth near Trawsgoed

Trawsgoed Mansion is a 17th-century country house, also known as Crosswood Park, formerly the seat of the Earl of Lisburne. It is a Grade II* listed building.

It was the 6th Earl of Lisburne who added the 50-room Victorian wing to the old Georgian mansion and built the summerhouse, squash and tennis courts, and the ornamental fountain. He also had the library ceiling painted in the style of those at Windsor Castle. The house eventually included seventy rooms, gardens with rare Chilean and Himalayan tree species that thrive in the mild moist climate of coastal Wales, a stable block, lodge house, and an unencumbered view of the Cambrian Mountains. There are the remains of a small Roman fort adjoining the grounds.

The mansion was sold in 2007 to the Edwards family, who spent five years restoring the house. Their work on Trawsgoed was featured on the television show The Restoration Man in 2010. The house was put up for sale in 2012.

The Vaughan family owns over 5,000 acres (20 km^{2}) of the original estate that includes upland pastures, Common Land and farmland on and adjoining Cors Caron. The estate lets shooting rights over and adjoining Forestry Commission woodlands and fishing rights on the River Ystwyth and Teifi. The house is set in listed parkland and gardens and is 8 miles (13 km) southeast of Aberystwyth.

The last remaining Vaughan member to be in residence at the house was the Honourable John Edward Malet Vaughan, born 3 October 1952. He is the youngest child of John David Malet Vaughan, 8th Earl of Lisburne, and Shelagh Macauley. Formerly a director of Savills, John Vaughan is the managing director of Trawsgoed Estates, Ltd.

== Lisburne Mines ==
The Trawsgoed estate was home to the Lisburne lead mines, among the most profitable in all of Wales. In the 1880s, Trawsgoed had the second largest lead mine in Britain. The mineral rights extend over an extensive area and are still owned by the estate.

== Notable neighbours ==
The estate shares a border along the River Ystwyth with that of the Hafod estate and Nanteos.

== Climate ==
The Met Office operates a weather station at Trawsgoed, providing climate data for the surrounding area. Trawsgoed experiences an oceanic climate (Köppen climate classification Cfb) similar to almost all of Wales and the United Kingdom. This translates to a narrow range of temperatures, rainfall in all seasons and low sunshine levels. Recent temperature extremes vary from 35.1 °C (95.2 °F) during July 2022, down to −13.8 °C (7.2 °F) during January 2010.

Typically, just under 48 nights of the year will record an air frost, and at least 1mm of rain will be reported on 174 days.

Trawsgoed holds the record for the warmest November temperature ever recorded in the UK, a high of 22.4 °C (72.3 °F) on 1 November 2015.

Climate data for Trawsgoed (1991–2020) (extremes 1992-present)
Month	Jan	Feb	Mar	Apr	May	Jun	Jul	Aug	Sep	Oct	Nov	Dec	Year
Record high °C (°F)	15.7 (60.3)	20.6 (69.1)	21.4 (70.5)	25.8 (78.4)	31.6 (88.9)	33.3 (91.9)	35.1 (95.2)	31.6 (88.9)	30.1 (86.2)	26.8 (80.2)	22.4 (72.3)	16.0 (60.8)	35.1 (95.2)
Mean daily maximum °C (°F)	8.4 (47.1)	8.7 (47.7)	10.6 (51.1)	13.2 (55.8)	16.1 (61.0)	18.4 (65.1)	19.9 (67.8)	19.6 (67.3)	17.9 (64.2)	14.6 (58.3)	11.2 (52.2)	8.9 (48.0)	14.0 (57.2)
Daily mean °C (°F)	5.3 (41.5)	5.4 (41.7)	6.7 (44.1)	8.8 (47.8)	11.5 (52.7)	14.0 (57.2)	15.8 (60.4)	15.7 (60.3)	13.7 (56.7)	11.0 (51.8)	7.8 (46.0)	5.7 (42.3)	10.1 (50.2)
Mean daily minimum °C (°F)	2.2 (36.0)	2.1 (35.8)	2.9 (37.2)	4.3 (39.7)	6.9 (44.4)	9.6 (49.3)	11.7 (53.1)	11.7 (53.1)	9.5 (49.1)	7.4 (45.3)	4.4 (39.9)	2.5 (36.5)	6.3 (43.3)
Record low °C (°F)	−13.8 (7.2)	−10.5 (13.1)	−10.1 (13.8)	−7.0 (19.4)	−3.3 (26.1)	0.5 (32.9)	2.4 (36.3)	1.3 (34.3)	−0.8 (30.6)	−5.8 (21.6)	−12.5 (9.5)	−12.3 (9.9)	−13.8 (7.2)
Average precipitation mm (inches)	126.2 (4.97)	98.0 (3.86)	87.2 (3.43)	71.6 (2.82)	70.6 (2.78)	84.5 (3.33)	86.3 (3.40)	93.1 (3.67)	98.0 (3.86)	137.7 (5.42)	140.8 (5.54)	147.9 (5.82)	1,241.7 (48.89)
Average precipitation days (≥ 1.0 mm)	16.9	13.9	13.7	12.7	11.9	11.8	13.4	14.2	13.6	15.9	18.3	17.7	173.9
Mean monthly sunshine hours	47.1	70.1	108.7	166.3	189.5	181.7	180.3	179.1	140.9	95.7	53.3	41.9	1,454.7
Source 1: Met Office
Source 2: Starlings Roost Weather
